

198001–198100 

|-bgcolor=#fefefe
| 198001 ||  || — || September 10, 2004 || Socorro || LINEAR || V || align=right | 1.0 km || 
|-id=002 bgcolor=#fefefe
| 198002 ||  || — || September 10, 2004 || Socorro || LINEAR || V || align=right | 1.1 km || 
|-id=003 bgcolor=#fefefe
| 198003 ||  || — || September 10, 2004 || Socorro || LINEAR || — || align=right | 1.4 km || 
|-id=004 bgcolor=#E9E9E9
| 198004 ||  || — || September 10, 2004 || Socorro || LINEAR || — || align=right | 2.2 km || 
|-id=005 bgcolor=#fefefe
| 198005 ||  || — || September 10, 2004 || Socorro || LINEAR || V || align=right | 1.2 km || 
|-id=006 bgcolor=#fefefe
| 198006 ||  || — || September 10, 2004 || Socorro || LINEAR || — || align=right | 1.6 km || 
|-id=007 bgcolor=#fefefe
| 198007 ||  || — || September 10, 2004 || Socorro || LINEAR || — || align=right | 1.4 km || 
|-id=008 bgcolor=#fefefe
| 198008 ||  || — || September 10, 2004 || Socorro || LINEAR || V || align=right | 1.0 km || 
|-id=009 bgcolor=#E9E9E9
| 198009 ||  || — || September 10, 2004 || Socorro || LINEAR || — || align=right | 1.3 km || 
|-id=010 bgcolor=#E9E9E9
| 198010 ||  || — || September 10, 2004 || Socorro || LINEAR || EUN || align=right | 2.4 km || 
|-id=011 bgcolor=#E9E9E9
| 198011 ||  || — || September 10, 2004 || Socorro || LINEAR || — || align=right | 2.6 km || 
|-id=012 bgcolor=#E9E9E9
| 198012 ||  || — || September 10, 2004 || Socorro || LINEAR || — || align=right | 2.1 km || 
|-id=013 bgcolor=#E9E9E9
| 198013 ||  || — || September 10, 2004 || Socorro || LINEAR || — || align=right | 3.0 km || 
|-id=014 bgcolor=#E9E9E9
| 198014 ||  || — || September 11, 2004 || Kitt Peak || Spacewatch || — || align=right | 1.4 km || 
|-id=015 bgcolor=#E9E9E9
| 198015 ||  || — || September 12, 2004 || Kitt Peak || Spacewatch || — || align=right | 1.9 km || 
|-id=016 bgcolor=#E9E9E9
| 198016 ||  || — || September 8, 2004 || Socorro || LINEAR || JUN || align=right | 1.5 km || 
|-id=017 bgcolor=#fefefe
| 198017 ||  || — || September 11, 2004 || Socorro || LINEAR || — || align=right | 3.0 km || 
|-id=018 bgcolor=#E9E9E9
| 198018 ||  || — || September 11, 2004 || Socorro || LINEAR || — || align=right | 1.9 km || 
|-id=019 bgcolor=#E9E9E9
| 198019 ||  || — || September 11, 2004 || Socorro || LINEAR || — || align=right | 2.9 km || 
|-id=020 bgcolor=#E9E9E9
| 198020 ||  || — || September 11, 2004 || Socorro || LINEAR || MAR || align=right | 3.4 km || 
|-id=021 bgcolor=#fefefe
| 198021 ||  || — || September 12, 2004 || Kitt Peak || Spacewatch || — || align=right | 1.1 km || 
|-id=022 bgcolor=#fefefe
| 198022 ||  || — || September 9, 2004 || Socorro || LINEAR || — || align=right | 1.5 km || 
|-id=023 bgcolor=#E9E9E9
| 198023 ||  || — || September 9, 2004 || Socorro || LINEAR || — || align=right | 2.2 km || 
|-id=024 bgcolor=#fefefe
| 198024 ||  || — || September 9, 2004 || Socorro || LINEAR || — || align=right | 1.2 km || 
|-id=025 bgcolor=#E9E9E9
| 198025 ||  || — || September 9, 2004 || Kitt Peak || Spacewatch || — || align=right | 1.3 km || 
|-id=026 bgcolor=#E9E9E9
| 198026 ||  || — || September 9, 2004 || Kitt Peak || Spacewatch || HEN || align=right | 1.3 km || 
|-id=027 bgcolor=#E9E9E9
| 198027 ||  || — || September 9, 2004 || Kitt Peak || Spacewatch || — || align=right | 2.0 km || 
|-id=028 bgcolor=#E9E9E9
| 198028 ||  || — || September 9, 2004 || Kitt Peak || Spacewatch || MIS || align=right | 3.5 km || 
|-id=029 bgcolor=#E9E9E9
| 198029 ||  || — || September 9, 2004 || Kitt Peak || Spacewatch || — || align=right | 1.4 km || 
|-id=030 bgcolor=#fefefe
| 198030 ||  || — || September 10, 2004 || Kitt Peak || Spacewatch || — || align=right | 1.0 km || 
|-id=031 bgcolor=#fefefe
| 198031 ||  || — || September 10, 2004 || Kitt Peak || Spacewatch || MAS || align=right data-sort-value="0.85" | 850 m || 
|-id=032 bgcolor=#E9E9E9
| 198032 ||  || — || September 10, 2004 || Kitt Peak || Spacewatch || — || align=right | 1.4 km || 
|-id=033 bgcolor=#fefefe
| 198033 ||  || — || September 10, 2004 || Kitt Peak || Spacewatch || NYS || align=right data-sort-value="0.99" | 990 m || 
|-id=034 bgcolor=#E9E9E9
| 198034 ||  || — || September 10, 2004 || Kitt Peak || Spacewatch || — || align=right | 1.2 km || 
|-id=035 bgcolor=#fefefe
| 198035 ||  || — || September 15, 2004 || Siding Spring || SSS || — || align=right | 1.8 km || 
|-id=036 bgcolor=#fefefe
| 198036 ||  || — || September 6, 2004 || Palomar || NEAT || — || align=right | 1.4 km || 
|-id=037 bgcolor=#fefefe
| 198037 ||  || — || September 6, 2004 || Palomar || NEAT || — || align=right | 1.4 km || 
|-id=038 bgcolor=#fefefe
| 198038 ||  || — || September 9, 2004 || Socorro || LINEAR || SUL || align=right | 2.5 km || 
|-id=039 bgcolor=#fefefe
| 198039 ||  || — || September 10, 2004 || Needville || Needville Obs. || — || align=right | 1.0 km || 
|-id=040 bgcolor=#E9E9E9
| 198040 ||  || — || September 11, 2004 || Kitt Peak || Spacewatch || — || align=right | 1.0 km || 
|-id=041 bgcolor=#E9E9E9
| 198041 ||  || — || September 11, 2004 || Kitt Peak || Spacewatch || — || align=right | 1.1 km || 
|-id=042 bgcolor=#fefefe
| 198042 ||  || — || September 12, 2004 || Kitt Peak || Spacewatch || — || align=right | 1.1 km || 
|-id=043 bgcolor=#fefefe
| 198043 ||  || — || September 13, 2004 || Kitt Peak || Spacewatch || — || align=right data-sort-value="0.91" | 910 m || 
|-id=044 bgcolor=#fefefe
| 198044 ||  || — || September 13, 2004 || Kitt Peak || Spacewatch || — || align=right | 1.1 km || 
|-id=045 bgcolor=#E9E9E9
| 198045 ||  || — || September 15, 2004 || Kitt Peak || Spacewatch || — || align=right | 1.0 km || 
|-id=046 bgcolor=#E9E9E9
| 198046 ||  || — || September 15, 2004 || Kitt Peak || Spacewatch || — || align=right | 1.0 km || 
|-id=047 bgcolor=#E9E9E9
| 198047 ||  || — || September 15, 2004 || 7300 Observatory || W. K. Y. Yeung || — || align=right | 2.7 km || 
|-id=048 bgcolor=#E9E9E9
| 198048 ||  || — || September 8, 2004 || Palomar || NEAT || — || align=right | 4.3 km || 
|-id=049 bgcolor=#fefefe
| 198049 ||  || — || September 9, 2004 || Socorro || LINEAR || — || align=right | 1.4 km || 
|-id=050 bgcolor=#fefefe
| 198050 ||  || — || September 11, 2004 || Kitt Peak || Spacewatch || NYS || align=right | 3.2 km || 
|-id=051 bgcolor=#E9E9E9
| 198051 ||  || — || September 11, 2004 || Kitt Peak || Spacewatch || RAF || align=right | 1.4 km || 
|-id=052 bgcolor=#E9E9E9
| 198052 ||  || — || September 11, 2004 || Kitt Peak || Spacewatch || — || align=right | 1.2 km || 
|-id=053 bgcolor=#fefefe
| 198053 ||  || — || September 11, 2004 || Kitt Peak || Spacewatch || NYS || align=right data-sort-value="0.79" | 790 m || 
|-id=054 bgcolor=#fefefe
| 198054 ||  || — || September 12, 2004 || Socorro || LINEAR || — || align=right | 1.0 km || 
|-id=055 bgcolor=#E9E9E9
| 198055 ||  || — || September 12, 2004 || Socorro || LINEAR || — || align=right | 3.8 km || 
|-id=056 bgcolor=#fefefe
| 198056 ||  || — || September 13, 2004 || Kitt Peak || Spacewatch || V || align=right data-sort-value="0.92" | 920 m || 
|-id=057 bgcolor=#E9E9E9
| 198057 ||  || — || September 13, 2004 || Socorro || LINEAR || — || align=right | 1.8 km || 
|-id=058 bgcolor=#fefefe
| 198058 ||  || — || September 13, 2004 || Palomar || NEAT || — || align=right | 1.1 km || 
|-id=059 bgcolor=#E9E9E9
| 198059 ||  || — || September 11, 2004 || Socorro || LINEAR || MAR || align=right | 1.6 km || 
|-id=060 bgcolor=#fefefe
| 198060 ||  || — || September 13, 2004 || Socorro || LINEAR || — || align=right | 1.4 km || 
|-id=061 bgcolor=#E9E9E9
| 198061 ||  || — || September 13, 2004 || Socorro || LINEAR || — || align=right | 1.7 km || 
|-id=062 bgcolor=#E9E9E9
| 198062 ||  || — || September 13, 2004 || Socorro || LINEAR || — || align=right | 1.7 km || 
|-id=063 bgcolor=#E9E9E9
| 198063 ||  || — || September 13, 2004 || Socorro || LINEAR || — || align=right | 3.9 km || 
|-id=064 bgcolor=#E9E9E9
| 198064 ||  || — || September 13, 2004 || Socorro || LINEAR || — || align=right | 3.3 km || 
|-id=065 bgcolor=#E9E9E9
| 198065 ||  || — || September 13, 2004 || Socorro || LINEAR || — || align=right | 1.5 km || 
|-id=066 bgcolor=#E9E9E9
| 198066 ||  || — || September 13, 2004 || Socorro || LINEAR || — || align=right | 2.6 km || 
|-id=067 bgcolor=#fefefe
| 198067 ||  || — || September 14, 2004 || Socorro || LINEAR || — || align=right | 1.2 km || 
|-id=068 bgcolor=#E9E9E9
| 198068 ||  || — || September 15, 2004 || Anderson Mesa || LONEOS || — || align=right | 1.4 km || 
|-id=069 bgcolor=#fefefe
| 198069 ||  || — || September 15, 2004 || Kitt Peak || Spacewatch || NYS || align=right data-sort-value="0.97" | 970 m || 
|-id=070 bgcolor=#fefefe
| 198070 ||  || — || September 15, 2004 || Anderson Mesa || LONEOS || — || align=right | 1.8 km || 
|-id=071 bgcolor=#fefefe
| 198071 ||  || — || September 10, 2004 || Kitt Peak || Spacewatch || — || align=right data-sort-value="0.94" | 940 m || 
|-id=072 bgcolor=#fefefe
| 198072 ||  || — || September 10, 2004 || Socorro || LINEAR || — || align=right | 1.4 km || 
|-id=073 bgcolor=#E9E9E9
| 198073 ||  || — || September 10, 2004 || Kitt Peak || Spacewatch || HEN || align=right | 1.2 km || 
|-id=074 bgcolor=#fefefe
| 198074 ||  || — || September 16, 2004 || Goodricke-Pigott || R. A. Tucker || NYS || align=right | 1.1 km || 
|-id=075 bgcolor=#fefefe
| 198075 ||  || — || September 17, 2004 || Anderson Mesa || LONEOS || — || align=right | 3.5 km || 
|-id=076 bgcolor=#E9E9E9
| 198076 ||  || — || September 17, 2004 || Kitt Peak || Spacewatch || EUN || align=right | 2.0 km || 
|-id=077 bgcolor=#E9E9E9
| 198077 ||  || — || September 17, 2004 || Socorro || LINEAR || — || align=right | 1.7 km || 
|-id=078 bgcolor=#fefefe
| 198078 ||  || — || September 17, 2004 || Anderson Mesa || LONEOS || V || align=right | 1.3 km || 
|-id=079 bgcolor=#E9E9E9
| 198079 ||  || — || September 17, 2004 || Anderson Mesa || LONEOS || — || align=right | 1.6 km || 
|-id=080 bgcolor=#fefefe
| 198080 ||  || — || September 17, 2004 || Anderson Mesa || LONEOS || — || align=right | 1.1 km || 
|-id=081 bgcolor=#fefefe
| 198081 ||  || — || September 17, 2004 || Anderson Mesa || LONEOS || KLI || align=right | 2.7 km || 
|-id=082 bgcolor=#E9E9E9
| 198082 ||  || — || September 17, 2004 || Anderson Mesa || LONEOS || — || align=right | 1.5 km || 
|-id=083 bgcolor=#fefefe
| 198083 ||  || — || September 18, 2004 || Socorro || LINEAR || FLO || align=right | 1.0 km || 
|-id=084 bgcolor=#E9E9E9
| 198084 ||  || — || September 21, 2004 || Socorro || LINEAR || — || align=right | 4.5 km || 
|-id=085 bgcolor=#fefefe
| 198085 ||  || — || September 17, 2004 || Anderson Mesa || LONEOS || MAS || align=right | 1.1 km || 
|-id=086 bgcolor=#fefefe
| 198086 ||  || — || September 17, 2004 || Kitt Peak || Spacewatch || NYS || align=right | 2.7 km || 
|-id=087 bgcolor=#E9E9E9
| 198087 ||  || — || September 21, 2004 || Socorro || LINEAR || — || align=right | 2.9 km || 
|-id=088 bgcolor=#E9E9E9
| 198088 ||  || — || September 21, 2004 || Kitt Peak || Spacewatch || — || align=right | 1.9 km || 
|-id=089 bgcolor=#fefefe
| 198089 ||  || — || September 22, 2004 || Desert Eagle || W. K. Y. Yeung || — || align=right data-sort-value="0.94" | 940 m || 
|-id=090 bgcolor=#fefefe
| 198090 ||  || — || September 16, 2004 || Kitt Peak || Spacewatch || NYS || align=right data-sort-value="0.87" | 870 m || 
|-id=091 bgcolor=#fefefe
| 198091 ||  || — || September 16, 2004 || Kitt Peak || Spacewatch || — || align=right data-sort-value="0.90" | 900 m || 
|-id=092 bgcolor=#fefefe
| 198092 ||  || — || September 16, 2004 || Kitt Peak || Spacewatch || NYS || align=right data-sort-value="0.80" | 800 m || 
|-id=093 bgcolor=#E9E9E9
| 198093 ||  || — || September 17, 2004 || Socorro || LINEAR || HEN || align=right | 1.4 km || 
|-id=094 bgcolor=#E9E9E9
| 198094 ||  || — || September 17, 2004 || Socorro || LINEAR || — || align=right | 1.4 km || 
|-id=095 bgcolor=#fefefe
| 198095 ||  || — || September 17, 2004 || Socorro || LINEAR || — || align=right | 1.7 km || 
|-id=096 bgcolor=#E9E9E9
| 198096 ||  || — || September 17, 2004 || Socorro || LINEAR || — || align=right | 3.8 km || 
|-id=097 bgcolor=#E9E9E9
| 198097 ||  || — || September 17, 2004 || Socorro || LINEAR || EUN || align=right | 1.4 km || 
|-id=098 bgcolor=#E9E9E9
| 198098 ||  || — || September 17, 2004 || Socorro || LINEAR || — || align=right | 2.2 km || 
|-id=099 bgcolor=#E9E9E9
| 198099 ||  || — || September 17, 2004 || Socorro || LINEAR || — || align=right | 2.3 km || 
|-id=100 bgcolor=#fefefe
| 198100 ||  || — || September 18, 2004 || Socorro || LINEAR || V || align=right data-sort-value="0.96" | 960 m || 
|}

198101–198200 

|-bgcolor=#fefefe
| 198101 ||  || — || September 18, 2004 || Socorro || LINEAR || NYS || align=right data-sort-value="0.93" | 930 m || 
|-id=102 bgcolor=#E9E9E9
| 198102 ||  || — || September 18, 2004 || Socorro || LINEAR || MAR || align=right | 2.0 km || 
|-id=103 bgcolor=#fefefe
| 198103 ||  || — || September 21, 2004 || Socorro || LINEAR || — || align=right | 2.0 km || 
|-id=104 bgcolor=#fefefe
| 198104 ||  || — || September 21, 2004 || Socorro || LINEAR || V || align=right data-sort-value="0.93" | 930 m || 
|-id=105 bgcolor=#E9E9E9
| 198105 ||  || — || September 22, 2004 || Kitt Peak || Spacewatch || — || align=right | 1.7 km || 
|-id=106 bgcolor=#E9E9E9
| 198106 ||  || — || September 22, 2004 || Kitt Peak || Spacewatch || — || align=right | 4.2 km || 
|-id=107 bgcolor=#fefefe
| 198107 ||  || — || September 18, 2004 || Socorro || LINEAR || V || align=right | 1.1 km || 
|-id=108 bgcolor=#fefefe
| 198108 ||  || — || September 22, 2004 || Socorro || LINEAR || — || align=right | 1.4 km || 
|-id=109 bgcolor=#E9E9E9
| 198109 ||  || — || September 22, 2004 || Socorro || LINEAR || EUN || align=right | 2.4 km || 
|-id=110 bgcolor=#E9E9E9
| 198110 Heathrhoades ||  ||  || September 17, 2004 || Wrightwood || J. W. Young || — || align=right | 1.7 km || 
|-id=111 bgcolor=#fefefe
| 198111 ||  || — || September 16, 2004 || Anderson Mesa || LONEOS || — || align=right | 1.8 km || 
|-id=112 bgcolor=#E9E9E9
| 198112 ||  || — || October 4, 2004 || Kitt Peak || Spacewatch || — || align=right | 4.0 km || 
|-id=113 bgcolor=#fefefe
| 198113 ||  || — || October 4, 2004 || Kitt Peak || Spacewatch || V || align=right data-sort-value="0.89" | 890 m || 
|-id=114 bgcolor=#fefefe
| 198114 ||  || — || October 4, 2004 || Kitt Peak || Spacewatch || — || align=right | 2.2 km || 
|-id=115 bgcolor=#E9E9E9
| 198115 ||  || — || October 4, 2004 || Kitt Peak || Spacewatch || — || align=right | 1.9 km || 
|-id=116 bgcolor=#E9E9E9
| 198116 ||  || — || October 4, 2004 || Kitt Peak || Spacewatch || — || align=right | 1.2 km || 
|-id=117 bgcolor=#E9E9E9
| 198117 ||  || — || October 4, 2004 || Kitt Peak || Spacewatch || — || align=right | 3.7 km || 
|-id=118 bgcolor=#fefefe
| 198118 ||  || — || October 2, 2004 || Palomar || NEAT || — || align=right | 1.3 km || 
|-id=119 bgcolor=#fefefe
| 198119 ||  || — || October 4, 2004 || Anderson Mesa || LONEOS || MAS || align=right data-sort-value="0.88" | 880 m || 
|-id=120 bgcolor=#fefefe
| 198120 ||  || — || October 5, 2004 || Goodricke-Pigott || R. A. Tucker || NYS || align=right data-sort-value="0.83" | 830 m || 
|-id=121 bgcolor=#E9E9E9
| 198121 ||  || — || October 7, 2004 || Socorro || LINEAR || JUN || align=right | 3.8 km || 
|-id=122 bgcolor=#fefefe
| 198122 ||  || — || October 9, 2004 || Goodricke-Pigott || R. A. Tucker || CLA || align=right | 2.0 km || 
|-id=123 bgcolor=#E9E9E9
| 198123 ||  || — || October 4, 2004 || Kitt Peak || Spacewatch || — || align=right | 1.1 km || 
|-id=124 bgcolor=#fefefe
| 198124 ||  || — || October 11, 2004 || Kitt Peak || Spacewatch || NYS || align=right data-sort-value="0.87" | 870 m || 
|-id=125 bgcolor=#E9E9E9
| 198125 ||  || — || October 12, 2004 || Moletai || K. Černis, J. Zdanavičius || — || align=right | 2.4 km || 
|-id=126 bgcolor=#E9E9E9
| 198126 ||  || — || October 14, 2004 || Goodricke-Pigott || R. A. Tucker || — || align=right | 1.4 km || 
|-id=127 bgcolor=#fefefe
| 198127 ||  || — || October 4, 2004 || Kitt Peak || Spacewatch || NYS || align=right | 1.0 km || 
|-id=128 bgcolor=#fefefe
| 198128 ||  || — || October 4, 2004 || Kitt Peak || Spacewatch || — || align=right | 1.3 km || 
|-id=129 bgcolor=#fefefe
| 198129 ||  || — || October 4, 2004 || Kitt Peak || Spacewatch || — || align=right | 1.5 km || 
|-id=130 bgcolor=#E9E9E9
| 198130 ||  || — || October 4, 2004 || Anderson Mesa || LONEOS || — || align=right | 1.8 km || 
|-id=131 bgcolor=#E9E9E9
| 198131 ||  || — || October 4, 2004 || Anderson Mesa || LONEOS || — || align=right | 3.3 km || 
|-id=132 bgcolor=#E9E9E9
| 198132 ||  || — || October 4, 2004 || Kitt Peak || Spacewatch || — || align=right | 2.1 km || 
|-id=133 bgcolor=#E9E9E9
| 198133 ||  || — || October 4, 2004 || Anderson Mesa || LONEOS || — || align=right | 1.5 km || 
|-id=134 bgcolor=#E9E9E9
| 198134 ||  || — || October 4, 2004 || Anderson Mesa || LONEOS || — || align=right | 3.1 km || 
|-id=135 bgcolor=#E9E9E9
| 198135 ||  || — || October 4, 2004 || Kitt Peak || Spacewatch || — || align=right | 2.5 km || 
|-id=136 bgcolor=#E9E9E9
| 198136 ||  || — || October 4, 2004 || Kitt Peak || Spacewatch || — || align=right | 1.3 km || 
|-id=137 bgcolor=#E9E9E9
| 198137 ||  || — || October 4, 2004 || Kitt Peak || Spacewatch || HEN || align=right | 1.4 km || 
|-id=138 bgcolor=#fefefe
| 198138 ||  || — || October 4, 2004 || Kitt Peak || Spacewatch || V || align=right | 1.0 km || 
|-id=139 bgcolor=#E9E9E9
| 198139 ||  || — || October 4, 2004 || Kitt Peak || Spacewatch || — || align=right | 1.5 km || 
|-id=140 bgcolor=#fefefe
| 198140 ||  || — || October 4, 2004 || Kitt Peak || Spacewatch || NYS || align=right data-sort-value="0.75" | 750 m || 
|-id=141 bgcolor=#fefefe
| 198141 ||  || — || October 4, 2004 || Kitt Peak || Spacewatch || NYS || align=right | 1.2 km || 
|-id=142 bgcolor=#E9E9E9
| 198142 ||  || — || October 4, 2004 || Kitt Peak || Spacewatch || — || align=right | 1.4 km || 
|-id=143 bgcolor=#E9E9E9
| 198143 ||  || — || October 4, 2004 || Kitt Peak || Spacewatch || — || align=right | 1.3 km || 
|-id=144 bgcolor=#E9E9E9
| 198144 ||  || — || October 4, 2004 || Kitt Peak || Spacewatch || — || align=right | 1.3 km || 
|-id=145 bgcolor=#E9E9E9
| 198145 ||  || — || October 4, 2004 || Kitt Peak || Spacewatch || — || align=right | 2.0 km || 
|-id=146 bgcolor=#E9E9E9
| 198146 ||  || — || October 4, 2004 || Kitt Peak || Spacewatch || — || align=right | 2.1 km || 
|-id=147 bgcolor=#E9E9E9
| 198147 ||  || — || October 4, 2004 || Kitt Peak || Spacewatch || — || align=right | 2.1 km || 
|-id=148 bgcolor=#E9E9E9
| 198148 ||  || — || October 4, 2004 || Kitt Peak || Spacewatch || — || align=right | 1.5 km || 
|-id=149 bgcolor=#E9E9E9
| 198149 ||  || — || October 4, 2004 || Kitt Peak || Spacewatch || — || align=right | 3.2 km || 
|-id=150 bgcolor=#E9E9E9
| 198150 ||  || — || October 4, 2004 || Kitt Peak || Spacewatch || — || align=right | 1.8 km || 
|-id=151 bgcolor=#E9E9E9
| 198151 ||  || — || October 4, 2004 || Kitt Peak || Spacewatch || — || align=right | 1.6 km || 
|-id=152 bgcolor=#E9E9E9
| 198152 ||  || — || October 4, 2004 || Kitt Peak || Spacewatch || — || align=right | 1.7 km || 
|-id=153 bgcolor=#E9E9E9
| 198153 ||  || — || October 4, 2004 || Kitt Peak || Spacewatch || — || align=right | 3.1 km || 
|-id=154 bgcolor=#E9E9E9
| 198154 ||  || — || October 4, 2004 || Kitt Peak || Spacewatch || — || align=right | 1.4 km || 
|-id=155 bgcolor=#fefefe
| 198155 ||  || — || October 5, 2004 || Anderson Mesa || LONEOS || V || align=right | 1.0 km || 
|-id=156 bgcolor=#fefefe
| 198156 ||  || — || October 5, 2004 || Anderson Mesa || LONEOS || NYS || align=right data-sort-value="0.94" | 940 m || 
|-id=157 bgcolor=#E9E9E9
| 198157 ||  || — || October 5, 2004 || Anderson Mesa || LONEOS || — || align=right | 3.8 km || 
|-id=158 bgcolor=#E9E9E9
| 198158 ||  || — || October 5, 2004 || Anderson Mesa || LONEOS || — || align=right | 1.8 km || 
|-id=159 bgcolor=#fefefe
| 198159 ||  || — || October 6, 2004 || Kitt Peak || Spacewatch || ERI || align=right | 2.6 km || 
|-id=160 bgcolor=#E9E9E9
| 198160 ||  || — || October 6, 2004 || Kitt Peak || Spacewatch || — || align=right | 1.3 km || 
|-id=161 bgcolor=#fefefe
| 198161 ||  || — || October 6, 2004 || Kitt Peak || Spacewatch || MAS || align=right | 1.2 km || 
|-id=162 bgcolor=#E9E9E9
| 198162 ||  || — || October 6, 2004 || Kitt Peak || Spacewatch || — || align=right | 3.4 km || 
|-id=163 bgcolor=#E9E9E9
| 198163 ||  || — || October 6, 2004 || Kitt Peak || Spacewatch || — || align=right | 2.5 km || 
|-id=164 bgcolor=#E9E9E9
| 198164 ||  || — || October 6, 2004 || Kitt Peak || Spacewatch || — || align=right | 1.2 km || 
|-id=165 bgcolor=#E9E9E9
| 198165 ||  || — || October 6, 2004 || Palomar || NEAT || — || align=right | 2.5 km || 
|-id=166 bgcolor=#E9E9E9
| 198166 ||  || — || October 7, 2004 || Kitt Peak || Spacewatch || — || align=right | 1.5 km || 
|-id=167 bgcolor=#E9E9E9
| 198167 ||  || — || October 4, 2004 || Kitt Peak || Spacewatch || — || align=right | 2.0 km || 
|-id=168 bgcolor=#E9E9E9
| 198168 ||  || — || October 5, 2004 || Kitt Peak || Spacewatch || — || align=right | 1.1 km || 
|-id=169 bgcolor=#E9E9E9
| 198169 ||  || — || October 5, 2004 || Kitt Peak || Spacewatch || — || align=right | 1.1 km || 
|-id=170 bgcolor=#E9E9E9
| 198170 ||  || — || October 5, 2004 || Kitt Peak || Spacewatch || — || align=right | 1.5 km || 
|-id=171 bgcolor=#fefefe
| 198171 ||  || — || October 5, 2004 || Kitt Peak || Spacewatch || — || align=right | 1.1 km || 
|-id=172 bgcolor=#fefefe
| 198172 ||  || — || October 5, 2004 || Kitt Peak || Spacewatch || MAS || align=right | 1.2 km || 
|-id=173 bgcolor=#E9E9E9
| 198173 ||  || — || October 5, 2004 || Kitt Peak || Spacewatch || — || align=right | 1.5 km || 
|-id=174 bgcolor=#E9E9E9
| 198174 ||  || — || October 6, 2004 || Kitt Peak || Spacewatch || — || align=right | 3.2 km || 
|-id=175 bgcolor=#fefefe
| 198175 ||  || — || October 6, 2004 || Palomar || NEAT || — || align=right | 1.8 km || 
|-id=176 bgcolor=#E9E9E9
| 198176 ||  || — || October 6, 2004 || Palomar || NEAT || KRM || align=right | 5.0 km || 
|-id=177 bgcolor=#E9E9E9
| 198177 ||  || — || October 7, 2004 || Anderson Mesa || LONEOS || — || align=right | 3.6 km || 
|-id=178 bgcolor=#E9E9E9
| 198178 ||  || — || October 7, 2004 || Anderson Mesa || LONEOS || — || align=right | 2.4 km || 
|-id=179 bgcolor=#fefefe
| 198179 ||  || — || October 7, 2004 || Socorro || LINEAR || — || align=right | 1.6 km || 
|-id=180 bgcolor=#E9E9E9
| 198180 ||  || — || October 7, 2004 || Socorro || LINEAR || MAR || align=right | 1.5 km || 
|-id=181 bgcolor=#fefefe
| 198181 ||  || — || October 7, 2004 || Socorro || LINEAR || — || align=right | 1.4 km || 
|-id=182 bgcolor=#E9E9E9
| 198182 ||  || — || October 7, 2004 || Socorro || LINEAR || — || align=right | 3.0 km || 
|-id=183 bgcolor=#E9E9E9
| 198183 ||  || — || October 7, 2004 || Anderson Mesa || LONEOS || — || align=right | 2.4 km || 
|-id=184 bgcolor=#E9E9E9
| 198184 ||  || — || October 7, 2004 || Socorro || LINEAR || — || align=right | 5.1 km || 
|-id=185 bgcolor=#E9E9E9
| 198185 ||  || — || October 7, 2004 || Palomar || NEAT || — || align=right | 1.9 km || 
|-id=186 bgcolor=#E9E9E9
| 198186 ||  || — || October 7, 2004 || Palomar || NEAT || — || align=right | 1.8 km || 
|-id=187 bgcolor=#fefefe
| 198187 ||  || — || October 7, 2004 || Socorro || LINEAR || — || align=right | 1.7 km || 
|-id=188 bgcolor=#E9E9E9
| 198188 ||  || — || October 7, 2004 || Socorro || LINEAR || — || align=right | 2.5 km || 
|-id=189 bgcolor=#E9E9E9
| 198189 ||  || — || October 7, 2004 || Socorro || LINEAR || — || align=right | 1.2 km || 
|-id=190 bgcolor=#fefefe
| 198190 ||  || — || October 7, 2004 || Socorro || LINEAR || — || align=right | 1.0 km || 
|-id=191 bgcolor=#fefefe
| 198191 ||  || — || October 7, 2004 || Socorro || LINEAR || V || align=right data-sort-value="0.94" | 940 m || 
|-id=192 bgcolor=#fefefe
| 198192 ||  || — || October 7, 2004 || Socorro || LINEAR || — || align=right | 1.1 km || 
|-id=193 bgcolor=#E9E9E9
| 198193 ||  || — || October 7, 2004 || Socorro || LINEAR || — || align=right | 1.4 km || 
|-id=194 bgcolor=#E9E9E9
| 198194 ||  || — || October 7, 2004 || Anderson Mesa || LONEOS || — || align=right | 1.2 km || 
|-id=195 bgcolor=#E9E9E9
| 198195 ||  || — || October 7, 2004 || Palomar || NEAT || MAR || align=right | 1.7 km || 
|-id=196 bgcolor=#E9E9E9
| 198196 ||  || — || October 8, 2004 || Anderson Mesa || LONEOS || — || align=right | 3.1 km || 
|-id=197 bgcolor=#fefefe
| 198197 ||  || — || October 8, 2004 || Anderson Mesa || LONEOS || — || align=right | 1.4 km || 
|-id=198 bgcolor=#E9E9E9
| 198198 ||  || — || October 8, 2004 || Anderson Mesa || LONEOS || — || align=right | 1.4 km || 
|-id=199 bgcolor=#E9E9E9
| 198199 ||  || — || October 8, 2004 || Anderson Mesa || LONEOS || EUN || align=right | 1.7 km || 
|-id=200 bgcolor=#E9E9E9
| 198200 ||  || — || October 9, 2004 || Anderson Mesa || LONEOS || — || align=right | 3.7 km || 
|}

198201–198300 

|-bgcolor=#E9E9E9
| 198201 ||  || — || October 4, 2004 || Kitt Peak || Spacewatch || — || align=right | 2.0 km || 
|-id=202 bgcolor=#E9E9E9
| 198202 ||  || — || October 4, 2004 || Kitt Peak || Spacewatch || AGN || align=right | 1.9 km || 
|-id=203 bgcolor=#E9E9E9
| 198203 ||  || — || October 4, 2004 || Kitt Peak || Spacewatch || HEN || align=right | 1.1 km || 
|-id=204 bgcolor=#E9E9E9
| 198204 ||  || — || October 4, 2004 || Kitt Peak || Spacewatch || — || align=right | 2.9 km || 
|-id=205 bgcolor=#E9E9E9
| 198205 ||  || — || October 6, 2004 || Kitt Peak || Spacewatch || — || align=right | 1.8 km || 
|-id=206 bgcolor=#fefefe
| 198206 ||  || — || October 6, 2004 || Kitt Peak || Spacewatch || NYS || align=right | 1.4 km || 
|-id=207 bgcolor=#fefefe
| 198207 ||  || — || October 6, 2004 || Kitt Peak || Spacewatch || NYS || align=right data-sort-value="0.91" | 910 m || 
|-id=208 bgcolor=#E9E9E9
| 198208 ||  || — || October 6, 2004 || Kitt Peak || Spacewatch || — || align=right data-sort-value="0.99" | 990 m || 
|-id=209 bgcolor=#E9E9E9
| 198209 ||  || — || October 6, 2004 || Kitt Peak || Spacewatch || EUN || align=right | 2.1 km || 
|-id=210 bgcolor=#E9E9E9
| 198210 ||  || — || October 6, 2004 || Kitt Peak || Spacewatch || — || align=right | 2.1 km || 
|-id=211 bgcolor=#E9E9E9
| 198211 ||  || — || October 6, 2004 || Kitt Peak || Spacewatch || EUN || align=right | 2.1 km || 
|-id=212 bgcolor=#fefefe
| 198212 ||  || — || October 7, 2004 || Kitt Peak || Spacewatch || NYS || align=right data-sort-value="0.96" | 960 m || 
|-id=213 bgcolor=#fefefe
| 198213 ||  || — || October 7, 2004 || Kitt Peak || Spacewatch || — || align=right | 1.1 km || 
|-id=214 bgcolor=#E9E9E9
| 198214 ||  || — || October 7, 2004 || Kitt Peak || Spacewatch || — || align=right | 1.8 km || 
|-id=215 bgcolor=#E9E9E9
| 198215 ||  || — || October 7, 2004 || Kitt Peak || Spacewatch || — || align=right | 1.5 km || 
|-id=216 bgcolor=#E9E9E9
| 198216 ||  || — || October 7, 2004 || Socorro || LINEAR || — || align=right | 1.8 km || 
|-id=217 bgcolor=#E9E9E9
| 198217 ||  || — || October 8, 2004 || Socorro || LINEAR || — || align=right | 3.0 km || 
|-id=218 bgcolor=#E9E9E9
| 198218 ||  || — || October 8, 2004 || Socorro || LINEAR || — || align=right | 4.4 km || 
|-id=219 bgcolor=#E9E9E9
| 198219 ||  || — || October 9, 2004 || Socorro || LINEAR || — || align=right | 1.2 km || 
|-id=220 bgcolor=#E9E9E9
| 198220 ||  || — || October 9, 2004 || Socorro || LINEAR || — || align=right | 1.1 km || 
|-id=221 bgcolor=#E9E9E9
| 198221 ||  || — || October 9, 2004 || Socorro || LINEAR || — || align=right | 2.8 km || 
|-id=222 bgcolor=#E9E9E9
| 198222 ||  || — || October 9, 2004 || Socorro || LINEAR || — || align=right | 1.7 km || 
|-id=223 bgcolor=#fefefe
| 198223 ||  || — || October 7, 2004 || Kitt Peak || Spacewatch || NYS || align=right data-sort-value="0.74" | 740 m || 
|-id=224 bgcolor=#fefefe
| 198224 ||  || — || October 7, 2004 || Kitt Peak || Spacewatch || — || align=right data-sort-value="0.88" | 880 m || 
|-id=225 bgcolor=#E9E9E9
| 198225 ||  || — || October 7, 2004 || Kitt Peak || Spacewatch || — || align=right | 2.8 km || 
|-id=226 bgcolor=#E9E9E9
| 198226 ||  || — || October 7, 2004 || Kitt Peak || Spacewatch || — || align=right | 1.6 km || 
|-id=227 bgcolor=#E9E9E9
| 198227 ||  || — || October 7, 2004 || Kitt Peak || Spacewatch || — || align=right | 1.7 km || 
|-id=228 bgcolor=#fefefe
| 198228 ||  || — || October 7, 2004 || Kitt Peak || Spacewatch || — || align=right | 1.5 km || 
|-id=229 bgcolor=#fefefe
| 198229 ||  || — || October 7, 2004 || Kitt Peak || Spacewatch || NYS || align=right data-sort-value="0.83" | 830 m || 
|-id=230 bgcolor=#fefefe
| 198230 ||  || — || October 7, 2004 || Kitt Peak || Spacewatch || V || align=right | 1.2 km || 
|-id=231 bgcolor=#E9E9E9
| 198231 ||  || — || October 7, 2004 || Kitt Peak || Spacewatch || — || align=right | 1.7 km || 
|-id=232 bgcolor=#fefefe
| 198232 ||  || — || October 7, 2004 || Kitt Peak || Spacewatch || NYS || align=right data-sort-value="0.79" | 790 m || 
|-id=233 bgcolor=#E9E9E9
| 198233 ||  || — || October 7, 2004 || Kitt Peak || Spacewatch || — || align=right | 1.1 km || 
|-id=234 bgcolor=#E9E9E9
| 198234 ||  || — || October 7, 2004 || Kitt Peak || Spacewatch || — || align=right | 1.4 km || 
|-id=235 bgcolor=#E9E9E9
| 198235 ||  || — || October 7, 2004 || Kitt Peak || Spacewatch || — || align=right | 4.1 km || 
|-id=236 bgcolor=#E9E9E9
| 198236 ||  || — || October 7, 2004 || Kitt Peak || Spacewatch || — || align=right | 1.1 km || 
|-id=237 bgcolor=#E9E9E9
| 198237 ||  || — || October 7, 2004 || Kitt Peak || Spacewatch || — || align=right | 3.6 km || 
|-id=238 bgcolor=#E9E9E9
| 198238 ||  || — || October 7, 2004 || Kitt Peak || Spacewatch || — || align=right | 3.3 km || 
|-id=239 bgcolor=#E9E9E9
| 198239 ||  || — || October 7, 2004 || Kitt Peak || Spacewatch || HEN || align=right | 1.6 km || 
|-id=240 bgcolor=#E9E9E9
| 198240 ||  || — || October 7, 2004 || Kitt Peak || Spacewatch || — || align=right | 1.4 km || 
|-id=241 bgcolor=#E9E9E9
| 198241 ||  || — || October 7, 2004 || Kitt Peak || Spacewatch || XIZ || align=right | 1.9 km || 
|-id=242 bgcolor=#E9E9E9
| 198242 ||  || — || October 7, 2004 || Kitt Peak || Spacewatch || — || align=right | 1.8 km || 
|-id=243 bgcolor=#E9E9E9
| 198243 ||  || — || October 7, 2004 || Kitt Peak || Spacewatch || — || align=right | 1.7 km || 
|-id=244 bgcolor=#E9E9E9
| 198244 ||  || — || October 7, 2004 || Kitt Peak || Spacewatch || — || align=right | 2.8 km || 
|-id=245 bgcolor=#fefefe
| 198245 ||  || — || October 8, 2004 || Kitt Peak || Spacewatch || — || align=right | 1.1 km || 
|-id=246 bgcolor=#E9E9E9
| 198246 ||  || — || October 8, 2004 || Kitt Peak || Spacewatch || MAR || align=right | 1.7 km || 
|-id=247 bgcolor=#E9E9E9
| 198247 ||  || — || October 9, 2004 || Kitt Peak || Spacewatch || — || align=right | 1.8 km || 
|-id=248 bgcolor=#E9E9E9
| 198248 ||  || — || October 9, 2004 || Kitt Peak || Spacewatch || — || align=right | 1.2 km || 
|-id=249 bgcolor=#E9E9E9
| 198249 ||  || — || October 6, 2004 || Kitt Peak || Spacewatch || — || align=right | 2.2 km || 
|-id=250 bgcolor=#fefefe
| 198250 ||  || — || October 3, 2004 || Palomar || NEAT || — || align=right | 1.5 km || 
|-id=251 bgcolor=#E9E9E9
| 198251 ||  || — || October 5, 2004 || Kitt Peak || Spacewatch || — || align=right | 2.2 km || 
|-id=252 bgcolor=#E9E9E9
| 198252 ||  || — || October 7, 2004 || Socorro || LINEAR || EUN || align=right | 1.8 km || 
|-id=253 bgcolor=#E9E9E9
| 198253 ||  || — || October 7, 2004 || Socorro || LINEAR || — || align=right | 3.6 km || 
|-id=254 bgcolor=#E9E9E9
| 198254 ||  || — || October 8, 2004 || Kitt Peak || Spacewatch || — || align=right data-sort-value="0.93" | 930 m || 
|-id=255 bgcolor=#fefefe
| 198255 ||  || — || October 8, 2004 || Kitt Peak || Spacewatch || — || align=right data-sort-value="0.89" | 890 m || 
|-id=256 bgcolor=#E9E9E9
| 198256 ||  || — || October 8, 2004 || Kitt Peak || Spacewatch || — || align=right | 1.3 km || 
|-id=257 bgcolor=#E9E9E9
| 198257 ||  || — || October 8, 2004 || Kitt Peak || Spacewatch || — || align=right | 1.8 km || 
|-id=258 bgcolor=#E9E9E9
| 198258 ||  || — || October 9, 2004 || Kitt Peak || Spacewatch || — || align=right | 1.9 km || 
|-id=259 bgcolor=#fefefe
| 198259 ||  || — || October 6, 2004 || Socorro || LINEAR || V || align=right | 1.2 km || 
|-id=260 bgcolor=#E9E9E9
| 198260 ||  || — || October 6, 2004 || Socorro || LINEAR || EUN || align=right | 1.8 km || 
|-id=261 bgcolor=#E9E9E9
| 198261 ||  || — || October 6, 2004 || Kitt Peak || Spacewatch || — || align=right | 1.3 km || 
|-id=262 bgcolor=#E9E9E9
| 198262 ||  || — || October 7, 2004 || Socorro || LINEAR || — || align=right | 1.9 km || 
|-id=263 bgcolor=#E9E9E9
| 198263 ||  || — || October 7, 2004 || Socorro || LINEAR || JUN || align=right | 1.8 km || 
|-id=264 bgcolor=#E9E9E9
| 198264 ||  || — || October 9, 2004 || Socorro || LINEAR || MAR || align=right | 1.5 km || 
|-id=265 bgcolor=#E9E9E9
| 198265 ||  || — || October 9, 2004 || Kitt Peak || Spacewatch || — || align=right | 1.1 km || 
|-id=266 bgcolor=#E9E9E9
| 198266 ||  || — || October 9, 2004 || Socorro || LINEAR || — || align=right | 5.0 km || 
|-id=267 bgcolor=#E9E9E9
| 198267 ||  || — || October 9, 2004 || Kitt Peak || Spacewatch || — || align=right | 2.3 km || 
|-id=268 bgcolor=#E9E9E9
| 198268 ||  || — || October 9, 2004 || Kitt Peak || Spacewatch || — || align=right | 2.9 km || 
|-id=269 bgcolor=#E9E9E9
| 198269 ||  || — || October 9, 2004 || Kitt Peak || Spacewatch || — || align=right | 1.8 km || 
|-id=270 bgcolor=#E9E9E9
| 198270 ||  || — || October 9, 2004 || Kitt Peak || Spacewatch || — || align=right | 1.7 km || 
|-id=271 bgcolor=#E9E9E9
| 198271 ||  || — || October 9, 2004 || Kitt Peak || Spacewatch || — || align=right | 1.8 km || 
|-id=272 bgcolor=#fefefe
| 198272 ||  || — || October 9, 2004 || Kitt Peak || Spacewatch || NYS || align=right | 1.1 km || 
|-id=273 bgcolor=#E9E9E9
| 198273 ||  || — || October 9, 2004 || Kitt Peak || Spacewatch || — || align=right | 2.0 km || 
|-id=274 bgcolor=#fefefe
| 198274 ||  || — || October 9, 2004 || Kitt Peak || Spacewatch || MAS || align=right | 1.2 km || 
|-id=275 bgcolor=#E9E9E9
| 198275 ||  || — || October 9, 2004 || Kitt Peak || Spacewatch || MIS || align=right | 4.1 km || 
|-id=276 bgcolor=#E9E9E9
| 198276 ||  || — || October 9, 2004 || Kitt Peak || Spacewatch || — || align=right | 3.6 km || 
|-id=277 bgcolor=#E9E9E9
| 198277 ||  || — || October 9, 2004 || Kitt Peak || Spacewatch || — || align=right | 2.2 km || 
|-id=278 bgcolor=#E9E9E9
| 198278 ||  || — || October 7, 2004 || Socorro || LINEAR || NEM || align=right | 2.5 km || 
|-id=279 bgcolor=#E9E9E9
| 198279 ||  || — || October 10, 2004 || Kitt Peak || Spacewatch || — || align=right | 2.3 km || 
|-id=280 bgcolor=#E9E9E9
| 198280 ||  || — || October 10, 2004 || Kitt Peak || Spacewatch || — || align=right | 1.3 km || 
|-id=281 bgcolor=#E9E9E9
| 198281 ||  || — || October 10, 2004 || Kitt Peak || Spacewatch || — || align=right | 1.1 km || 
|-id=282 bgcolor=#E9E9E9
| 198282 ||  || — || October 10, 2004 || Kitt Peak || Spacewatch || — || align=right | 2.0 km || 
|-id=283 bgcolor=#E9E9E9
| 198283 ||  || — || October 10, 2004 || Kitt Peak || Spacewatch || — || align=right | 3.0 km || 
|-id=284 bgcolor=#E9E9E9
| 198284 ||  || — || October 11, 2004 || Kitt Peak || Spacewatch || BRU || align=right | 3.2 km || 
|-id=285 bgcolor=#E9E9E9
| 198285 ||  || — || October 12, 2004 || Anderson Mesa || LONEOS || — || align=right | 4.5 km || 
|-id=286 bgcolor=#E9E9E9
| 198286 ||  || — || October 12, 2004 || Anderson Mesa || LONEOS || — || align=right | 3.2 km || 
|-id=287 bgcolor=#fefefe
| 198287 ||  || — || October 13, 2004 || Kitt Peak || Spacewatch || NYS || align=right data-sort-value="0.83" | 830 m || 
|-id=288 bgcolor=#E9E9E9
| 198288 ||  || — || October 8, 2004 || Socorro || LINEAR || — || align=right | 2.1 km || 
|-id=289 bgcolor=#E9E9E9
| 198289 ||  || — || October 8, 2004 || Socorro || LINEAR || DOR || align=right | 4.6 km || 
|-id=290 bgcolor=#E9E9E9
| 198290 ||  || — || October 8, 2004 || Socorro || LINEAR || — || align=right | 2.2 km || 
|-id=291 bgcolor=#E9E9E9
| 198291 ||  || — || October 9, 2004 || Socorro || LINEAR || MRX || align=right | 1.2 km || 
|-id=292 bgcolor=#E9E9E9
| 198292 ||  || — || October 10, 2004 || Socorro || LINEAR || — || align=right | 2.7 km || 
|-id=293 bgcolor=#E9E9E9
| 198293 ||  || — || October 10, 2004 || Socorro || LINEAR || — || align=right | 1.7 km || 
|-id=294 bgcolor=#E9E9E9
| 198294 ||  || — || October 10, 2004 || Socorro || LINEAR || WIT || align=right | 1.6 km || 
|-id=295 bgcolor=#E9E9E9
| 198295 ||  || — || October 10, 2004 || Socorro || LINEAR || ADE || align=right | 2.7 km || 
|-id=296 bgcolor=#E9E9E9
| 198296 ||  || — || October 10, 2004 || Socorro || LINEAR || — || align=right | 1.2 km || 
|-id=297 bgcolor=#fefefe
| 198297 ||  || — || October 11, 2004 || Kitt Peak || Spacewatch || — || align=right | 1.2 km || 
|-id=298 bgcolor=#E9E9E9
| 198298 ||  || — || October 11, 2004 || Kitt Peak || Spacewatch || — || align=right | 3.2 km || 
|-id=299 bgcolor=#E9E9E9
| 198299 ||  || — || October 11, 2004 || Kitt Peak || Spacewatch || — || align=right | 1.7 km || 
|-id=300 bgcolor=#fefefe
| 198300 ||  || — || October 11, 2004 || Kitt Peak || Spacewatch || NYS || align=right | 1.1 km || 
|}

198301–198400 

|-bgcolor=#E9E9E9
| 198301 ||  || — || October 11, 2004 || Kitt Peak || Spacewatch || AST || align=right | 3.6 km || 
|-id=302 bgcolor=#E9E9E9
| 198302 ||  || — || October 12, 2004 || Kitt Peak || Spacewatch || — || align=right | 1.9 km || 
|-id=303 bgcolor=#E9E9E9
| 198303 ||  || — || October 12, 2004 || Kitt Peak || Spacewatch || — || align=right | 2.4 km || 
|-id=304 bgcolor=#E9E9E9
| 198304 ||  || — || October 12, 2004 || Kitt Peak || Spacewatch || RAF || align=right | 1.3 km || 
|-id=305 bgcolor=#E9E9E9
| 198305 ||  || — || October 4, 2004 || Palomar || NEAT || — || align=right | 1.4 km || 
|-id=306 bgcolor=#E9E9E9
| 198306 ||  || — || October 4, 2004 || Palomar || NEAT || — || align=right | 3.5 km || 
|-id=307 bgcolor=#E9E9E9
| 198307 ||  || — || October 9, 2004 || Socorro || LINEAR || — || align=right | 2.7 km || 
|-id=308 bgcolor=#d6d6d6
| 198308 ||  || — || October 9, 2004 || Kitt Peak || Spacewatch || — || align=right | 3.3 km || 
|-id=309 bgcolor=#E9E9E9
| 198309 ||  || — || October 9, 2004 || Kitt Peak || Spacewatch || — || align=right | 3.4 km || 
|-id=310 bgcolor=#E9E9E9
| 198310 ||  || — || October 9, 2004 || Kitt Peak || Spacewatch || — || align=right | 1.4 km || 
|-id=311 bgcolor=#E9E9E9
| 198311 ||  || — || October 10, 2004 || Kitt Peak || Spacewatch || RAF || align=right data-sort-value="0.95" | 950 m || 
|-id=312 bgcolor=#E9E9E9
| 198312 ||  || — || October 10, 2004 || Kitt Peak || Spacewatch || — || align=right | 3.5 km || 
|-id=313 bgcolor=#E9E9E9
| 198313 ||  || — || October 10, 2004 || Kitt Peak || Spacewatch || — || align=right | 2.3 km || 
|-id=314 bgcolor=#E9E9E9
| 198314 ||  || — || October 10, 2004 || Kitt Peak || Spacewatch || — || align=right | 2.0 km || 
|-id=315 bgcolor=#E9E9E9
| 198315 ||  || — || October 12, 2004 || Anderson Mesa || LONEOS || — || align=right | 3.0 km || 
|-id=316 bgcolor=#E9E9E9
| 198316 ||  || — || October 13, 2004 || Kitt Peak || Spacewatch || — || align=right | 1.1 km || 
|-id=317 bgcolor=#E9E9E9
| 198317 ||  || — || October 13, 2004 || Kitt Peak || Spacewatch || — || align=right | 2.3 km || 
|-id=318 bgcolor=#E9E9E9
| 198318 ||  || — || October 13, 2004 || Kitt Peak || Spacewatch || — || align=right | 1.9 km || 
|-id=319 bgcolor=#E9E9E9
| 198319 ||  || — || October 13, 2004 || Kitt Peak || Spacewatch || — || align=right | 2.1 km || 
|-id=320 bgcolor=#E9E9E9
| 198320 ||  || — || October 15, 2004 || Anderson Mesa || LONEOS || — || align=right | 1.9 km || 
|-id=321 bgcolor=#fefefe
| 198321 ||  || — || October 7, 2004 || Kitt Peak || Spacewatch || — || align=right | 1.6 km || 
|-id=322 bgcolor=#E9E9E9
| 198322 ||  || — || October 9, 2004 || Socorro || LINEAR || — || align=right | 2.1 km || 
|-id=323 bgcolor=#E9E9E9
| 198323 ||  || — || October 7, 2004 || Socorro || LINEAR || — || align=right | 1.9 km || 
|-id=324 bgcolor=#fefefe
| 198324 ||  || — || October 7, 2004 || Socorro || LINEAR || V || align=right data-sort-value="0.94" | 940 m || 
|-id=325 bgcolor=#fefefe
| 198325 ||  || — || October 14, 2004 || Anderson Mesa || LONEOS || — || align=right | 3.2 km || 
|-id=326 bgcolor=#E9E9E9
| 198326 ||  || — || October 6, 2004 || Kitt Peak || Spacewatch || — || align=right | 1.3 km || 
|-id=327 bgcolor=#E9E9E9
| 198327 ||  || — || October 9, 2004 || Socorro || LINEAR || — || align=right | 3.3 km || 
|-id=328 bgcolor=#E9E9E9
| 198328 ||  || — || October 12, 2004 || Kitt Peak || Spacewatch || — || align=right | 2.9 km || 
|-id=329 bgcolor=#E9E9E9
| 198329 ||  || — || October 13, 2004 || Socorro || LINEAR || — || align=right | 1.4 km || 
|-id=330 bgcolor=#E9E9E9
| 198330 ||  || — || October 9, 2004 || Kitt Peak || Spacewatch || — || align=right | 1.9 km || 
|-id=331 bgcolor=#E9E9E9
| 198331 ||  || — || October 9, 2004 || Kitt Peak || Spacewatch || — || align=right | 1.1 km || 
|-id=332 bgcolor=#E9E9E9
| 198332 ||  || — || October 6, 2004 || Kitt Peak || Spacewatch || — || align=right | 1.3 km || 
|-id=333 bgcolor=#E9E9E9
| 198333 || 2004 UA || — || October 16, 2004 || Pla D'Arguines || R. Ferrando || — || align=right | 2.7 km || 
|-id=334 bgcolor=#E9E9E9
| 198334 ||  || — || October 23, 2004 || Socorro || LINEAR || — || align=right | 1.9 km || 
|-id=335 bgcolor=#E9E9E9
| 198335 ||  || — || October 18, 2004 || Socorro || LINEAR || — || align=right | 1.9 km || 
|-id=336 bgcolor=#E9E9E9
| 198336 ||  || — || October 19, 2004 || Socorro || LINEAR || — || align=right | 2.0 km || 
|-id=337 bgcolor=#E9E9E9
| 198337 ||  || — || October 16, 2004 || Socorro || LINEAR || — || align=right | 4.3 km || 
|-id=338 bgcolor=#E9E9E9
| 198338 ||  || — || October 18, 2004 || Socorro || LINEAR || — || align=right | 1.7 km || 
|-id=339 bgcolor=#E9E9E9
| 198339 ||  || — || October 20, 2004 || Socorro || LINEAR || — || align=right | 3.4 km || 
|-id=340 bgcolor=#E9E9E9
| 198340 ||  || — || October 20, 2004 || Socorro || LINEAR || — || align=right | 1.5 km || 
|-id=341 bgcolor=#E9E9E9
| 198341 ||  || — || October 21, 2004 || Socorro || LINEAR || — || align=right | 1.4 km || 
|-id=342 bgcolor=#E9E9E9
| 198342 ||  || — || October 23, 2004 || Socorro || LINEAR || — || align=right | 6.1 km || 
|-id=343 bgcolor=#E9E9E9
| 198343 || 2004 VG || — || November 2, 2004 || Palomar || NEAT || ADE || align=right | 4.2 km || 
|-id=344 bgcolor=#E9E9E9
| 198344 || 2004 VU || — || November 2, 2004 || Anderson Mesa || LONEOS || — || align=right | 4.1 km || 
|-id=345 bgcolor=#E9E9E9
| 198345 ||  || — || November 3, 2004 || Palomar || NEAT || — || align=right | 2.2 km || 
|-id=346 bgcolor=#E9E9E9
| 198346 ||  || — || November 3, 2004 || Kitt Peak || Spacewatch || — || align=right | 1.6 km || 
|-id=347 bgcolor=#E9E9E9
| 198347 ||  || — || November 3, 2004 || Anderson Mesa || LONEOS || — || align=right | 2.8 km || 
|-id=348 bgcolor=#E9E9E9
| 198348 ||  || — || November 3, 2004 || Anderson Mesa || LONEOS || EUN || align=right | 2.4 km || 
|-id=349 bgcolor=#E9E9E9
| 198349 ||  || — || November 3, 2004 || Anderson Mesa || LONEOS || MAR || align=right | 1.8 km || 
|-id=350 bgcolor=#E9E9E9
| 198350 ||  || — || November 3, 2004 || Palomar || NEAT || — || align=right | 1.4 km || 
|-id=351 bgcolor=#E9E9E9
| 198351 ||  || — || November 3, 2004 || Kitt Peak || Spacewatch || ADE || align=right | 4.4 km || 
|-id=352 bgcolor=#E9E9E9
| 198352 ||  || — || November 3, 2004 || Kitt Peak || Spacewatch || — || align=right | 2.2 km || 
|-id=353 bgcolor=#E9E9E9
| 198353 ||  || — || November 3, 2004 || Anderson Mesa || LONEOS || MIS || align=right | 3.4 km || 
|-id=354 bgcolor=#E9E9E9
| 198354 ||  || — || November 3, 2004 || Anderson Mesa || LONEOS || — || align=right | 1.6 km || 
|-id=355 bgcolor=#E9E9E9
| 198355 ||  || — || November 3, 2004 || Anderson Mesa || LONEOS || ADE || align=right | 3.8 km || 
|-id=356 bgcolor=#E9E9E9
| 198356 ||  || — || November 3, 2004 || Anderson Mesa || LONEOS || — || align=right | 2.9 km || 
|-id=357 bgcolor=#fefefe
| 198357 ||  || — || November 3, 2004 || Palomar || NEAT || V || align=right | 1.2 km || 
|-id=358 bgcolor=#E9E9E9
| 198358 ||  || — || November 3, 2004 || Catalina || CSS || — || align=right | 2.6 km || 
|-id=359 bgcolor=#E9E9E9
| 198359 ||  || — || November 3, 2004 || Catalina || CSS || — || align=right | 2.4 km || 
|-id=360 bgcolor=#E9E9E9
| 198360 ||  || — || November 3, 2004 || Palomar || NEAT || — || align=right | 1.5 km || 
|-id=361 bgcolor=#E9E9E9
| 198361 ||  || — || November 3, 2004 || Palomar || NEAT || — || align=right | 2.8 km || 
|-id=362 bgcolor=#E9E9E9
| 198362 ||  || — || November 3, 2004 || Palomar || NEAT || — || align=right | 1.8 km || 
|-id=363 bgcolor=#E9E9E9
| 198363 ||  || — || November 4, 2004 || Anderson Mesa || LONEOS || MAR || align=right | 2.5 km || 
|-id=364 bgcolor=#fefefe
| 198364 ||  || — || November 4, 2004 || Kitt Peak || Spacewatch || NYS || align=right | 1.0 km || 
|-id=365 bgcolor=#E9E9E9
| 198365 ||  || — || November 5, 2004 || Needville || J. Dellinger, A. Lowe || — || align=right | 1.6 km || 
|-id=366 bgcolor=#E9E9E9
| 198366 ||  || — || November 4, 2004 || Catalina || CSS || MAR || align=right | 1.5 km || 
|-id=367 bgcolor=#E9E9E9
| 198367 ||  || — || November 4, 2004 || Kitt Peak || Spacewatch || HEN || align=right | 1.5 km || 
|-id=368 bgcolor=#E9E9E9
| 198368 ||  || — || November 4, 2004 || Kitt Peak || Spacewatch || — || align=right | 2.8 km || 
|-id=369 bgcolor=#E9E9E9
| 198369 ||  || — || November 4, 2004 || Anderson Mesa || LONEOS || MAR || align=right | 2.0 km || 
|-id=370 bgcolor=#E9E9E9
| 198370 ||  || — || November 4, 2004 || Anderson Mesa || LONEOS || — || align=right | 1.9 km || 
|-id=371 bgcolor=#E9E9E9
| 198371 ||  || — || November 4, 2004 || Catalina || CSS || — || align=right | 4.4 km || 
|-id=372 bgcolor=#E9E9E9
| 198372 ||  || — || November 4, 2004 || Catalina || CSS || — || align=right | 1.4 km || 
|-id=373 bgcolor=#E9E9E9
| 198373 ||  || — || November 4, 2004 || Catalina || CSS || MIS || align=right | 3.5 km || 
|-id=374 bgcolor=#E9E9E9
| 198374 ||  || — || November 4, 2004 || Catalina || CSS || — || align=right | 1.6 km || 
|-id=375 bgcolor=#E9E9E9
| 198375 ||  || — || November 5, 2004 || Palomar || NEAT || MIS || align=right | 3.3 km || 
|-id=376 bgcolor=#E9E9E9
| 198376 ||  || — || November 5, 2004 || Anderson Mesa || LONEOS || EUN || align=right | 2.0 km || 
|-id=377 bgcolor=#E9E9E9
| 198377 ||  || — || November 4, 2004 || Catalina || CSS || — || align=right | 2.0 km || 
|-id=378 bgcolor=#E9E9E9
| 198378 ||  || — || November 5, 2004 || Palomar || NEAT || MAR || align=right | 1.7 km || 
|-id=379 bgcolor=#E9E9E9
| 198379 ||  || — || November 7, 2004 || Socorro || LINEAR || — || align=right | 2.3 km || 
|-id=380 bgcolor=#E9E9E9
| 198380 ||  || — || November 8, 2004 || Antares || R. Holmes || — || align=right | 4.0 km || 
|-id=381 bgcolor=#E9E9E9
| 198381 ||  || — || November 3, 2004 || Kitt Peak || Spacewatch || — || align=right | 1.6 km || 
|-id=382 bgcolor=#E9E9E9
| 198382 ||  || — || November 3, 2004 || Kitt Peak || Spacewatch || — || align=right | 1.3 km || 
|-id=383 bgcolor=#E9E9E9
| 198383 ||  || — || November 3, 2004 || Kitt Peak || Spacewatch || — || align=right | 2.0 km || 
|-id=384 bgcolor=#E9E9E9
| 198384 ||  || — || November 3, 2004 || Kitt Peak || Spacewatch || — || align=right | 2.3 km || 
|-id=385 bgcolor=#E9E9E9
| 198385 ||  || — || November 3, 2004 || Kitt Peak || Spacewatch || — || align=right | 2.7 km || 
|-id=386 bgcolor=#E9E9E9
| 198386 ||  || — || November 3, 2004 || Kitt Peak || Spacewatch || — || align=right | 2.7 km || 
|-id=387 bgcolor=#E9E9E9
| 198387 ||  || — || November 3, 2004 || Kitt Peak || Spacewatch || — || align=right | 1.9 km || 
|-id=388 bgcolor=#E9E9E9
| 198388 ||  || — || November 3, 2004 || Kitt Peak || Spacewatch || — || align=right | 2.0 km || 
|-id=389 bgcolor=#E9E9E9
| 198389 ||  || — || November 3, 2004 || Kitt Peak || Spacewatch || — || align=right | 1.7 km || 
|-id=390 bgcolor=#E9E9E9
| 198390 ||  || — || November 4, 2004 || Kitt Peak || Spacewatch || — || align=right | 3.6 km || 
|-id=391 bgcolor=#E9E9E9
| 198391 ||  || — || November 4, 2004 || Kitt Peak || Spacewatch || — || align=right | 3.3 km || 
|-id=392 bgcolor=#fefefe
| 198392 ||  || — || November 4, 2004 || Kitt Peak || Spacewatch || NYS || align=right | 1.0 km || 
|-id=393 bgcolor=#E9E9E9
| 198393 ||  || — || November 4, 2004 || Kitt Peak || Spacewatch || — || align=right | 1.8 km || 
|-id=394 bgcolor=#E9E9E9
| 198394 ||  || — || November 4, 2004 || Kitt Peak || Spacewatch || HEN || align=right | 1.5 km || 
|-id=395 bgcolor=#E9E9E9
| 198395 ||  || — || November 4, 2004 || Kitt Peak || Spacewatch || — || align=right | 1.8 km || 
|-id=396 bgcolor=#E9E9E9
| 198396 ||  || — || November 4, 2004 || Kitt Peak || Spacewatch || — || align=right | 2.1 km || 
|-id=397 bgcolor=#E9E9E9
| 198397 ||  || — || November 4, 2004 || Catalina || CSS || — || align=right | 2.4 km || 
|-id=398 bgcolor=#E9E9E9
| 198398 ||  || — || November 4, 2004 || Catalina || CSS || ADE || align=right | 4.3 km || 
|-id=399 bgcolor=#E9E9E9
| 198399 ||  || — || November 4, 2004 || Catalina || CSS || — || align=right | 3.1 km || 
|-id=400 bgcolor=#fefefe
| 198400 ||  || — || November 5, 2004 || Campo Imperatore || CINEOS || — || align=right | 1.4 km || 
|}

198401–198500 

|-bgcolor=#E9E9E9
| 198401 ||  || — || November 5, 2004 || Campo Imperatore || CINEOS || — || align=right | 2.3 km || 
|-id=402 bgcolor=#E9E9E9
| 198402 ||  || — || November 4, 2004 || Socorro || LINEAR || MAR || align=right | 2.8 km || 
|-id=403 bgcolor=#d6d6d6
| 198403 ||  || — || November 9, 2004 || Goodricke-Pigott || R. A. Tucker || — || align=right | 3.4 km || 
|-id=404 bgcolor=#E9E9E9
| 198404 ||  || — || November 4, 2004 || Catalina || CSS || — || align=right | 2.0 km || 
|-id=405 bgcolor=#E9E9E9
| 198405 ||  || — || November 4, 2004 || Catalina || CSS || NEM || align=right | 3.1 km || 
|-id=406 bgcolor=#E9E9E9
| 198406 ||  || — || November 4, 2004 || Catalina || CSS || JUN || align=right | 2.7 km || 
|-id=407 bgcolor=#E9E9E9
| 198407 ||  || — || November 9, 2004 || Catalina || CSS || — || align=right | 3.1 km || 
|-id=408 bgcolor=#E9E9E9
| 198408 ||  || — || November 9, 2004 || Catalina || CSS || — || align=right | 2.4 km || 
|-id=409 bgcolor=#E9E9E9
| 198409 ||  || — || November 6, 2004 || Socorro || LINEAR || — || align=right | 1.4 km || 
|-id=410 bgcolor=#E9E9E9
| 198410 ||  || — || November 6, 2004 || Socorro || LINEAR || — || align=right | 2.1 km || 
|-id=411 bgcolor=#E9E9E9
| 198411 ||  || — || November 7, 2004 || Socorro || LINEAR || — || align=right | 1.3 km || 
|-id=412 bgcolor=#E9E9E9
| 198412 ||  || — || November 7, 2004 || Socorro || LINEAR || — || align=right | 2.4 km || 
|-id=413 bgcolor=#fefefe
| 198413 ||  || — || November 10, 2004 || Kitt Peak || Spacewatch || NYS || align=right | 1.1 km || 
|-id=414 bgcolor=#E9E9E9
| 198414 ||  || — || November 10, 2004 || Cordell-Lorenz || D. T. Durig, M. A. Mathison || — || align=right | 2.2 km || 
|-id=415 bgcolor=#d6d6d6
| 198415 ||  || — || November 3, 2004 || Catalina || CSS || — || align=right | 3.2 km || 
|-id=416 bgcolor=#E9E9E9
| 198416 ||  || — || November 7, 2004 || Socorro || LINEAR || — || align=right | 2.5 km || 
|-id=417 bgcolor=#E9E9E9
| 198417 ||  || — || November 9, 2004 || Goodricke-Pigott || Goodricke-Pigott Obs. || — || align=right | 1.8 km || 
|-id=418 bgcolor=#E9E9E9
| 198418 ||  || — || November 4, 2004 || Anderson Mesa || LONEOS || EUN || align=right | 1.9 km || 
|-id=419 bgcolor=#E9E9E9
| 198419 ||  || — || November 5, 2004 || Anderson Mesa || LONEOS || — || align=right | 1.6 km || 
|-id=420 bgcolor=#E9E9E9
| 198420 ||  || — || November 5, 2004 || Anderson Mesa || LONEOS || — || align=right | 2.7 km || 
|-id=421 bgcolor=#E9E9E9
| 198421 ||  || — || November 12, 2004 || Catalina || CSS || — || align=right | 1.8 km || 
|-id=422 bgcolor=#E9E9E9
| 198422 ||  || — || November 12, 2004 || Socorro || LINEAR || EUN || align=right | 1.9 km || 
|-id=423 bgcolor=#E9E9E9
| 198423 ||  || — || November 3, 2004 || Anderson Mesa || LONEOS || RAF || align=right | 1.2 km || 
|-id=424 bgcolor=#E9E9E9
| 198424 ||  || — || November 3, 2004 || Anderson Mesa || LONEOS || — || align=right | 2.6 km || 
|-id=425 bgcolor=#E9E9E9
| 198425 ||  || — || November 4, 2004 || Kitt Peak || Spacewatch || — || align=right | 3.0 km || 
|-id=426 bgcolor=#E9E9E9
| 198426 ||  || — || November 9, 2004 || Catalina || CSS || — || align=right | 2.9 km || 
|-id=427 bgcolor=#E9E9E9
| 198427 ||  || — || November 10, 2004 || Kitt Peak || Spacewatch || — || align=right | 1.3 km || 
|-id=428 bgcolor=#E9E9E9
| 198428 ||  || — || November 11, 2004 || Kitt Peak || Spacewatch || — || align=right | 2.3 km || 
|-id=429 bgcolor=#E9E9E9
| 198429 ||  || — || November 11, 2004 || Kitt Peak || Spacewatch || — || align=right | 4.3 km || 
|-id=430 bgcolor=#E9E9E9
| 198430 ||  || — || November 9, 2004 || Catalina || CSS || — || align=right | 3.7 km || 
|-id=431 bgcolor=#E9E9E9
| 198431 ||  || — || November 9, 2004 || Catalina || CSS || RAF || align=right | 1.1 km || 
|-id=432 bgcolor=#E9E9E9
| 198432 ||  || — || November 10, 2004 || Kitt Peak || Spacewatch || — || align=right | 2.4 km || 
|-id=433 bgcolor=#E9E9E9
| 198433 ||  || — || November 9, 2004 || Mauna Kea || C. Veillet || HEN || align=right | 2.7 km || 
|-id=434 bgcolor=#E9E9E9
| 198434 || 2004 WX || — || November 17, 2004 || Siding Spring || SSS || — || align=right | 3.8 km || 
|-id=435 bgcolor=#E9E9E9
| 198435 ||  || — || November 19, 2004 || Socorro || LINEAR || — || align=right | 5.0 km || 
|-id=436 bgcolor=#E9E9E9
| 198436 ||  || — || November 17, 2004 || Siding Spring || SSS || — || align=right | 3.3 km || 
|-id=437 bgcolor=#E9E9E9
| 198437 ||  || — || November 17, 2004 || Campo Imperatore || CINEOS || — || align=right | 2.5 km || 
|-id=438 bgcolor=#E9E9E9
| 198438 ||  || — || November 19, 2004 || Socorro || LINEAR || — || align=right | 4.1 km || 
|-id=439 bgcolor=#E9E9E9
| 198439 ||  || — || November 19, 2004 || Socorro || LINEAR || — || align=right | 3.6 km || 
|-id=440 bgcolor=#E9E9E9
| 198440 ||  || — || November 19, 2004 || Socorro || LINEAR || — || align=right | 3.7 km || 
|-id=441 bgcolor=#d6d6d6
| 198441 ||  || — || November 19, 2004 || Socorro || LINEAR || — || align=right | 4.1 km || 
|-id=442 bgcolor=#E9E9E9
| 198442 ||  || — || November 19, 2004 || Catalina || CSS || — || align=right | 1.9 km || 
|-id=443 bgcolor=#E9E9E9
| 198443 ||  || — || November 19, 2004 || Socorro || LINEAR || — || align=right | 5.8 km || 
|-id=444 bgcolor=#E9E9E9
| 198444 ||  || — || November 20, 2004 || Kitt Peak || Spacewatch || — || align=right | 3.7 km || 
|-id=445 bgcolor=#E9E9E9
| 198445 ||  || — || December 3, 2004 || Cordell-Lorenz || Cordell–Lorenz Obs. || ADE || align=right | 4.1 km || 
|-id=446 bgcolor=#E9E9E9
| 198446 ||  || — || December 4, 2004 || Antares || R. Holmes || — || align=right | 4.1 km || 
|-id=447 bgcolor=#E9E9E9
| 198447 ||  || — || December 2, 2004 || Catalina || CSS || — || align=right | 2.5 km || 
|-id=448 bgcolor=#E9E9E9
| 198448 ||  || — || December 2, 2004 || Catalina || CSS || — || align=right | 3.9 km || 
|-id=449 bgcolor=#E9E9E9
| 198449 ||  || — || December 3, 2004 || Palomar || NEAT || EUN || align=right | 2.1 km || 
|-id=450 bgcolor=#E9E9E9
| 198450 Scattolin ||  ||  || December 9, 2004 || Jarnac || Jarnac Obs. || GEF || align=right | 1.9 km || 
|-id=451 bgcolor=#fefefe
| 198451 ||  || — || December 2, 2004 || Socorro || LINEAR || — || align=right | 1.9 km || 
|-id=452 bgcolor=#E9E9E9
| 198452 ||  || — || December 2, 2004 || Socorro || LINEAR || — || align=right | 2.5 km || 
|-id=453 bgcolor=#E9E9E9
| 198453 ||  || — || December 2, 2004 || Palomar || NEAT || — || align=right | 2.8 km || 
|-id=454 bgcolor=#E9E9E9
| 198454 ||  || — || December 2, 2004 || Socorro || LINEAR || — || align=right | 3.0 km || 
|-id=455 bgcolor=#E9E9E9
| 198455 ||  || — || December 2, 2004 || Catalina || CSS || — || align=right | 3.3 km || 
|-id=456 bgcolor=#E9E9E9
| 198456 ||  || — || December 2, 2004 || Palomar || NEAT || — || align=right | 4.3 km || 
|-id=457 bgcolor=#E9E9E9
| 198457 ||  || — || December 8, 2004 || Socorro || LINEAR || EUN || align=right | 2.7 km || 
|-id=458 bgcolor=#d6d6d6
| 198458 ||  || — || December 8, 2004 || Socorro || LINEAR || — || align=right | 7.2 km || 
|-id=459 bgcolor=#d6d6d6
| 198459 ||  || — || December 8, 2004 || Socorro || LINEAR || — || align=right | 4.3 km || 
|-id=460 bgcolor=#E9E9E9
| 198460 ||  || — || December 8, 2004 || Socorro || LINEAR || — || align=right | 3.0 km || 
|-id=461 bgcolor=#E9E9E9
| 198461 ||  || — || December 9, 2004 || Catalina || CSS || HNS || align=right | 2.2 km || 
|-id=462 bgcolor=#E9E9E9
| 198462 ||  || — || December 7, 2004 || Socorro || LINEAR || MIT || align=right | 3.2 km || 
|-id=463 bgcolor=#d6d6d6
| 198463 ||  || — || December 8, 2004 || Socorro || LINEAR || KOR || align=right | 2.0 km || 
|-id=464 bgcolor=#d6d6d6
| 198464 ||  || — || December 8, 2004 || Socorro || LINEAR || — || align=right | 3.6 km || 
|-id=465 bgcolor=#fefefe
| 198465 ||  || — || December 8, 2004 || Socorro || LINEAR || NYS || align=right | 1.1 km || 
|-id=466 bgcolor=#E9E9E9
| 198466 ||  || — || December 8, 2004 || Socorro || LINEAR || — || align=right | 1.3 km || 
|-id=467 bgcolor=#E9E9E9
| 198467 ||  || — || December 9, 2004 || Catalina || CSS || — || align=right | 2.1 km || 
|-id=468 bgcolor=#E9E9E9
| 198468 ||  || — || December 9, 2004 || Catalina || CSS || — || align=right | 2.2 km || 
|-id=469 bgcolor=#E9E9E9
| 198469 ||  || — || December 9, 2004 || Socorro || LINEAR || — || align=right | 4.4 km || 
|-id=470 bgcolor=#E9E9E9
| 198470 ||  || — || December 9, 2004 || Catalina || CSS || — || align=right | 2.0 km || 
|-id=471 bgcolor=#E9E9E9
| 198471 ||  || — || December 10, 2004 || Kitt Peak || Spacewatch || MRX || align=right | 1.8 km || 
|-id=472 bgcolor=#E9E9E9
| 198472 ||  || — || December 10, 2004 || Socorro || LINEAR || AST || align=right | 3.4 km || 
|-id=473 bgcolor=#E9E9E9
| 198473 ||  || — || December 10, 2004 || Socorro || LINEAR || NEM || align=right | 3.9 km || 
|-id=474 bgcolor=#E9E9E9
| 198474 ||  || — || December 10, 2004 || Socorro || LINEAR || — || align=right | 1.7 km || 
|-id=475 bgcolor=#E9E9E9
| 198475 ||  || — || December 11, 2004 || Campo Imperatore || CINEOS || — || align=right | 3.7 km || 
|-id=476 bgcolor=#E9E9E9
| 198476 ||  || — || December 7, 2004 || Socorro || LINEAR || EUN || align=right | 1.8 km || 
|-id=477 bgcolor=#E9E9E9
| 198477 ||  || — || December 7, 2004 || Socorro || LINEAR || JUN || align=right | 1.4 km || 
|-id=478 bgcolor=#E9E9E9
| 198478 ||  || — || December 7, 2004 || Socorro || LINEAR || HNS || align=right | 1.7 km || 
|-id=479 bgcolor=#E9E9E9
| 198479 ||  || — || December 7, 2004 || Socorro || LINEAR || EUN || align=right | 2.1 km || 
|-id=480 bgcolor=#E9E9E9
| 198480 ||  || — || December 11, 2004 || Socorro || LINEAR || — || align=right | 1.8 km || 
|-id=481 bgcolor=#d6d6d6
| 198481 ||  || — || December 9, 2004 || Bergisch Gladbach || W. Bickel || — || align=right | 4.4 km || 
|-id=482 bgcolor=#E9E9E9
| 198482 ||  || — || December 2, 2004 || Catalina || CSS || HOF || align=right | 4.6 km || 
|-id=483 bgcolor=#E9E9E9
| 198483 ||  || — || December 9, 2004 || Kitt Peak || Spacewatch || — || align=right | 3.1 km || 
|-id=484 bgcolor=#E9E9E9
| 198484 ||  || — || December 10, 2004 || Kitt Peak || Spacewatch || — || align=right | 3.9 km || 
|-id=485 bgcolor=#E9E9E9
| 198485 ||  || — || December 11, 2004 || Socorro || LINEAR || — || align=right | 5.1 km || 
|-id=486 bgcolor=#E9E9E9
| 198486 ||  || — || December 11, 2004 || Anderson Mesa || LONEOS || BAR || align=right | 3.0 km || 
|-id=487 bgcolor=#E9E9E9
| 198487 ||  || — || December 10, 2004 || Kitt Peak || Spacewatch || — || align=right | 3.6 km || 
|-id=488 bgcolor=#d6d6d6
| 198488 ||  || — || December 10, 2004 || Kitt Peak || Spacewatch || KOR || align=right | 1.8 km || 
|-id=489 bgcolor=#d6d6d6
| 198489 ||  || — || December 10, 2004 || Kitt Peak || Spacewatch || EOS || align=right | 3.4 km || 
|-id=490 bgcolor=#E9E9E9
| 198490 ||  || — || December 11, 2004 || Socorro || LINEAR || — || align=right | 4.7 km || 
|-id=491 bgcolor=#E9E9E9
| 198491 ||  || — || December 13, 2004 || Socorro || LINEAR || MIT || align=right | 3.2 km || 
|-id=492 bgcolor=#E9E9E9
| 198492 ||  || — || December 10, 2004 || Junk Bond || Junk Bond Obs. || — || align=right | 3.6 km || 
|-id=493 bgcolor=#E9E9E9
| 198493 ||  || — || December 2, 2004 || Catalina || CSS || — || align=right | 3.5 km || 
|-id=494 bgcolor=#fefefe
| 198494 ||  || — || December 3, 2004 || Kitt Peak || Spacewatch || V || align=right | 1.3 km || 
|-id=495 bgcolor=#E9E9E9
| 198495 ||  || — || December 10, 2004 || Socorro || LINEAR || WIT || align=right | 1.7 km || 
|-id=496 bgcolor=#fefefe
| 198496 ||  || — || December 9, 2004 || Catalina || CSS || — || align=right | 1.7 km || 
|-id=497 bgcolor=#E9E9E9
| 198497 ||  || — || December 9, 2004 || Catalina || CSS || — || align=right | 2.0 km || 
|-id=498 bgcolor=#E9E9E9
| 198498 ||  || — || December 10, 2004 || Socorro || LINEAR || — || align=right | 1.7 km || 
|-id=499 bgcolor=#E9E9E9
| 198499 ||  || — || December 10, 2004 || Socorro || LINEAR || — || align=right | 2.9 km || 
|-id=500 bgcolor=#E9E9E9
| 198500 ||  || — || December 10, 2004 || Catalina || CSS || — || align=right | 4.1 km || 
|}

198501–198600 

|-bgcolor=#E9E9E9
| 198501 ||  || — || December 8, 2004 || Socorro || LINEAR || — || align=right | 1.9 km || 
|-id=502 bgcolor=#d6d6d6
| 198502 ||  || — || December 10, 2004 || Kitt Peak || Spacewatch || — || align=right | 6.7 km || 
|-id=503 bgcolor=#E9E9E9
| 198503 ||  || — || December 10, 2004 || Socorro || LINEAR || — || align=right | 2.7 km || 
|-id=504 bgcolor=#E9E9E9
| 198504 ||  || — || December 10, 2004 || Socorro || LINEAR || — || align=right | 3.3 km || 
|-id=505 bgcolor=#E9E9E9
| 198505 ||  || — || December 10, 2004 || Socorro || LINEAR || — || align=right | 4.8 km || 
|-id=506 bgcolor=#d6d6d6
| 198506 ||  || — || December 10, 2004 || Socorro || LINEAR || — || align=right | 4.5 km || 
|-id=507 bgcolor=#E9E9E9
| 198507 ||  || — || December 10, 2004 || Socorro || LINEAR || — || align=right | 2.4 km || 
|-id=508 bgcolor=#E9E9E9
| 198508 ||  || — || December 10, 2004 || Kitt Peak || Spacewatch || — || align=right | 3.0 km || 
|-id=509 bgcolor=#E9E9E9
| 198509 ||  || — || December 11, 2004 || Socorro || LINEAR || — || align=right | 1.8 km || 
|-id=510 bgcolor=#d6d6d6
| 198510 ||  || — || December 11, 2004 || Kitt Peak || Spacewatch || — || align=right | 3.6 km || 
|-id=511 bgcolor=#d6d6d6
| 198511 ||  || — || December 12, 2004 || Kitt Peak || Spacewatch || — || align=right | 4.0 km || 
|-id=512 bgcolor=#E9E9E9
| 198512 ||  || — || December 12, 2004 || Kitt Peak || Spacewatch || — || align=right | 2.1 km || 
|-id=513 bgcolor=#E9E9E9
| 198513 ||  || — || December 9, 2004 || Catalina || CSS || fast? || align=right | 1.3 km || 
|-id=514 bgcolor=#fefefe
| 198514 ||  || — || December 9, 2004 || Catalina || CSS || NYS || align=right | 1.2 km || 
|-id=515 bgcolor=#E9E9E9
| 198515 ||  || — || December 10, 2004 || Kitt Peak || Spacewatch || PAD || align=right | 4.3 km || 
|-id=516 bgcolor=#E9E9E9
| 198516 ||  || — || December 10, 2004 || Campo Imperatore || CINEOS || — || align=right | 1.4 km || 
|-id=517 bgcolor=#E9E9E9
| 198517 ||  || — || December 11, 2004 || Socorro || LINEAR || MAR || align=right | 1.6 km || 
|-id=518 bgcolor=#E9E9E9
| 198518 ||  || — || December 11, 2004 || Kitt Peak || Spacewatch || — || align=right | 3.6 km || 
|-id=519 bgcolor=#E9E9E9
| 198519 ||  || — || December 11, 2004 || Kitt Peak || Spacewatch || NEM || align=right | 2.4 km || 
|-id=520 bgcolor=#E9E9E9
| 198520 ||  || — || December 11, 2004 || Kitt Peak || Spacewatch || — || align=right | 3.5 km || 
|-id=521 bgcolor=#d6d6d6
| 198521 ||  || — || December 11, 2004 || Kitt Peak || Spacewatch || NAE || align=right | 4.3 km || 
|-id=522 bgcolor=#d6d6d6
| 198522 ||  || — || December 11, 2004 || Kitt Peak || Spacewatch || EOS || align=right | 3.5 km || 
|-id=523 bgcolor=#E9E9E9
| 198523 ||  || — || December 14, 2004 || Socorro || LINEAR || HEN || align=right | 1.4 km || 
|-id=524 bgcolor=#E9E9E9
| 198524 ||  || — || December 14, 2004 || Catalina || CSS || HOF || align=right | 3.7 km || 
|-id=525 bgcolor=#d6d6d6
| 198525 ||  || — || December 14, 2004 || Catalina || CSS || — || align=right | 3.4 km || 
|-id=526 bgcolor=#E9E9E9
| 198526 ||  || — || December 9, 2004 || Catalina || CSS || — || align=right | 2.6 km || 
|-id=527 bgcolor=#d6d6d6
| 198527 ||  || — || December 9, 2004 || Kitt Peak || Spacewatch || — || align=right | 3.8 km || 
|-id=528 bgcolor=#E9E9E9
| 198528 ||  || — || December 11, 2004 || Socorro || LINEAR || — || align=right | 1.7 km || 
|-id=529 bgcolor=#E9E9E9
| 198529 ||  || — || December 11, 2004 || Socorro || LINEAR || — || align=right | 3.1 km || 
|-id=530 bgcolor=#E9E9E9
| 198530 ||  || — || December 11, 2004 || Socorro || LINEAR || — || align=right | 1.5 km || 
|-id=531 bgcolor=#fefefe
| 198531 ||  || — || December 11, 2004 || Socorro || LINEAR || — || align=right | 1.2 km || 
|-id=532 bgcolor=#E9E9E9
| 198532 ||  || — || December 11, 2004 || Socorro || LINEAR || — || align=right | 2.5 km || 
|-id=533 bgcolor=#E9E9E9
| 198533 ||  || — || December 11, 2004 || Socorro || LINEAR || — || align=right | 1.8 km || 
|-id=534 bgcolor=#E9E9E9
| 198534 ||  || — || December 11, 2004 || Socorro || LINEAR || — || align=right | 3.8 km || 
|-id=535 bgcolor=#E9E9E9
| 198535 ||  || — || December 12, 2004 || Socorro || LINEAR || — || align=right | 3.5 km || 
|-id=536 bgcolor=#E9E9E9
| 198536 ||  || — || December 14, 2004 || Catalina || CSS || — || align=right | 2.1 km || 
|-id=537 bgcolor=#E9E9E9
| 198537 ||  || — || December 14, 2004 || Kitt Peak || Spacewatch || — || align=right | 2.0 km || 
|-id=538 bgcolor=#E9E9E9
| 198538 ||  || — || December 12, 2004 || Kitt Peak || Spacewatch || HOF || align=right | 3.9 km || 
|-id=539 bgcolor=#E9E9E9
| 198539 ||  || — || December 14, 2004 || Socorro || LINEAR || — || align=right | 2.7 km || 
|-id=540 bgcolor=#E9E9E9
| 198540 ||  || — || December 9, 2004 || Catalina || CSS || — || align=right | 3.7 km || 
|-id=541 bgcolor=#E9E9E9
| 198541 ||  || — || December 10, 2004 || Socorro || LINEAR || — || align=right | 2.6 km || 
|-id=542 bgcolor=#d6d6d6
| 198542 ||  || — || December 10, 2004 || Socorro || LINEAR || — || align=right | 3.0 km || 
|-id=543 bgcolor=#E9E9E9
| 198543 ||  || — || December 12, 2004 || Anderson Mesa || LONEOS || — || align=right | 5.1 km || 
|-id=544 bgcolor=#E9E9E9
| 198544 ||  || — || December 13, 2004 || Kitt Peak || Spacewatch || — || align=right | 3.7 km || 
|-id=545 bgcolor=#E9E9E9
| 198545 ||  || — || December 11, 2004 || Socorro || LINEAR || — || align=right | 3.0 km || 
|-id=546 bgcolor=#E9E9E9
| 198546 ||  || — || December 11, 2004 || Socorro || LINEAR || — || align=right | 4.9 km || 
|-id=547 bgcolor=#E9E9E9
| 198547 ||  || — || December 11, 2004 || Socorro || LINEAR || — || align=right | 2.5 km || 
|-id=548 bgcolor=#E9E9E9
| 198548 ||  || — || December 11, 2004 || Socorro || LINEAR || — || align=right | 3.4 km || 
|-id=549 bgcolor=#E9E9E9
| 198549 ||  || — || December 14, 2004 || Socorro || LINEAR || — || align=right | 3.3 km || 
|-id=550 bgcolor=#E9E9E9
| 198550 ||  || — || December 15, 2004 || Socorro || LINEAR || — || align=right | 4.6 km || 
|-id=551 bgcolor=#E9E9E9
| 198551 ||  || — || December 15, 2004 || Socorro || LINEAR || — || align=right | 1.9 km || 
|-id=552 bgcolor=#E9E9E9
| 198552 ||  || — || December 15, 2004 || Socorro || LINEAR || — || align=right | 2.4 km || 
|-id=553 bgcolor=#E9E9E9
| 198553 ||  || — || December 15, 2004 || Socorro || LINEAR || — || align=right | 2.8 km || 
|-id=554 bgcolor=#E9E9E9
| 198554 ||  || — || December 15, 2004 || Socorro || LINEAR || — || align=right | 3.1 km || 
|-id=555 bgcolor=#E9E9E9
| 198555 ||  || — || December 13, 2004 || Campo Imperatore || CINEOS || — || align=right | 2.0 km || 
|-id=556 bgcolor=#E9E9E9
| 198556 ||  || — || December 13, 2004 || Socorro || LINEAR || — || align=right | 4.7 km || 
|-id=557 bgcolor=#E9E9E9
| 198557 ||  || — || December 14, 2004 || Socorro || LINEAR || MAR || align=right | 2.0 km || 
|-id=558 bgcolor=#FA8072
| 198558 ||  || — || December 14, 2004 || Socorro || LINEAR || — || align=right | 3.2 km || 
|-id=559 bgcolor=#E9E9E9
| 198559 ||  || — || December 14, 2004 || Socorro || LINEAR || INO || align=right | 2.3 km || 
|-id=560 bgcolor=#E9E9E9
| 198560 ||  || — || December 14, 2004 || Campo Imperatore || CINEOS || — || align=right | 2.1 km || 
|-id=561 bgcolor=#E9E9E9
| 198561 ||  || — || December 15, 2004 || Kitt Peak || Spacewatch || HOF || align=right | 3.2 km || 
|-id=562 bgcolor=#d6d6d6
| 198562 ||  || — || December 15, 2004 || Kitt Peak || Spacewatch || KOR || align=right | 1.5 km || 
|-id=563 bgcolor=#E9E9E9
| 198563 ||  || — || December 14, 2004 || Socorro || LINEAR || — || align=right | 2.1 km || 
|-id=564 bgcolor=#E9E9E9
| 198564 ||  || — || December 14, 2004 || Kitt Peak || Spacewatch || — || align=right | 3.4 km || 
|-id=565 bgcolor=#E9E9E9
| 198565 ||  || — || December 15, 2004 || Socorro || LINEAR || — || align=right | 2.1 km || 
|-id=566 bgcolor=#E9E9E9
| 198566 ||  || — || December 15, 2004 || Catalina || CSS || — || align=right | 4.7 km || 
|-id=567 bgcolor=#E9E9E9
| 198567 ||  || — || December 15, 2004 || Socorro || LINEAR || GEF || align=right | 1.9 km || 
|-id=568 bgcolor=#E9E9E9
| 198568 ||  || — || December 3, 2004 || Anderson Mesa || LONEOS || HNS || align=right | 2.0 km || 
|-id=569 bgcolor=#d6d6d6
| 198569 ||  || — || December 3, 2004 || Kitt Peak || Spacewatch || — || align=right | 3.0 km || 
|-id=570 bgcolor=#d6d6d6
| 198570 ||  || — || December 10, 2004 || Kitt Peak || Spacewatch || — || align=right | 4.1 km || 
|-id=571 bgcolor=#E9E9E9
| 198571 ||  || — || December 10, 2004 || Socorro || LINEAR || HEN || align=right | 1.6 km || 
|-id=572 bgcolor=#d6d6d6
| 198572 ||  || — || December 11, 2004 || Kitt Peak || Spacewatch || 628 || align=right | 3.3 km || 
|-id=573 bgcolor=#E9E9E9
| 198573 ||  || — || December 12, 2004 || Kitt Peak || Spacewatch || EUN || align=right | 1.8 km || 
|-id=574 bgcolor=#E9E9E9
| 198574 ||  || — || December 1, 2004 || Catalina || CSS || JUN || align=right | 1.3 km || 
|-id=575 bgcolor=#E9E9E9
| 198575 || 2004 YM || — || December 17, 2004 || Socorro || LINEAR || BRU || align=right | 6.0 km || 
|-id=576 bgcolor=#E9E9E9
| 198576 ||  || — || December 16, 2004 || Jarnac || Jarnac Obs. || — || align=right | 1.5 km || 
|-id=577 bgcolor=#E9E9E9
| 198577 ||  || — || December 16, 2004 || Kitt Peak || Spacewatch || — || align=right | 1.8 km || 
|-id=578 bgcolor=#E9E9E9
| 198578 ||  || — || December 18, 2004 || Mount Lemmon || Mount Lemmon Survey || — || align=right | 2.5 km || 
|-id=579 bgcolor=#d6d6d6
| 198579 ||  || — || December 18, 2004 || Mount Lemmon || Mount Lemmon Survey || — || align=right | 4.9 km || 
|-id=580 bgcolor=#E9E9E9
| 198580 ||  || — || December 18, 2004 || Mount Lemmon || Mount Lemmon Survey || AGN || align=right | 2.2 km || 
|-id=581 bgcolor=#E9E9E9
| 198581 ||  || — || December 18, 2004 || Mount Lemmon || Mount Lemmon Survey || — || align=right | 3.9 km || 
|-id=582 bgcolor=#d6d6d6
| 198582 ||  || — || December 18, 2004 || Mount Lemmon || Mount Lemmon Survey || EOSslow || align=right | 3.2 km || 
|-id=583 bgcolor=#d6d6d6
| 198583 ||  || — || December 18, 2004 || Mount Lemmon || Mount Lemmon Survey || HYG || align=right | 4.4 km || 
|-id=584 bgcolor=#d6d6d6
| 198584 ||  || — || December 18, 2004 || Mount Lemmon || Mount Lemmon Survey || — || align=right | 5.3 km || 
|-id=585 bgcolor=#E9E9E9
| 198585 ||  || — || December 16, 2004 || Anderson Mesa || LONEOS || — || align=right | 2.3 km || 
|-id=586 bgcolor=#E9E9E9
| 198586 ||  || — || December 19, 2004 || Catalina || CSS || — || align=right | 2.0 km || 
|-id=587 bgcolor=#E9E9E9
| 198587 ||  || — || December 17, 2004 || Anderson Mesa || LONEOS || — || align=right | 3.0 km || 
|-id=588 bgcolor=#E9E9E9
| 198588 ||  || — || December 21, 2004 || Catalina || CSS || — || align=right | 2.9 km || 
|-id=589 bgcolor=#E9E9E9
| 198589 ||  || — || December 16, 2004 || Anderson Mesa || LONEOS || — || align=right | 2.6 km || 
|-id=590 bgcolor=#d6d6d6
| 198590 ||  || — || December 18, 2004 || Mount Lemmon || Mount Lemmon Survey || — || align=right | 3.7 km || 
|-id=591 bgcolor=#E9E9E9
| 198591 ||  || — || December 19, 2004 || Anderson Mesa || LONEOS || — || align=right | 2.4 km || 
|-id=592 bgcolor=#E9E9E9
| 198592 Antbernal || 2005 AK ||  || January 3, 2005 || Begues || J. Manteca || — || align=right | 4.3 km || 
|-id=593 bgcolor=#d6d6d6
| 198593 ||  || — || January 1, 2005 || Catalina || CSS || — || align=right | 5.2 km || 
|-id=594 bgcolor=#E9E9E9
| 198594 ||  || — || January 1, 2005 || Catalina || CSS || — || align=right | 3.2 km || 
|-id=595 bgcolor=#d6d6d6
| 198595 ||  || — || January 6, 2005 || Catalina || CSS || EOS || align=right | 5.7 km || 
|-id=596 bgcolor=#E9E9E9
| 198596 ||  || — || January 6, 2005 || Catalina || CSS || DOR || align=right | 3.8 km || 
|-id=597 bgcolor=#d6d6d6
| 198597 ||  || — || January 6, 2005 || Catalina || CSS || — || align=right | 3.8 km || 
|-id=598 bgcolor=#d6d6d6
| 198598 ||  || — || January 6, 2005 || Catalina || CSS || — || align=right | 4.1 km || 
|-id=599 bgcolor=#E9E9E9
| 198599 ||  || — || January 6, 2005 || Catalina || CSS || — || align=right | 3.3 km || 
|-id=600 bgcolor=#E9E9E9
| 198600 ||  || — || January 6, 2005 || Catalina || CSS || — || align=right | 2.2 km || 
|}

198601–198700 

|-bgcolor=#E9E9E9
| 198601 ||  || — || January 1, 2005 || Catalina || CSS || — || align=right | 2.9 km || 
|-id=602 bgcolor=#fefefe
| 198602 ||  || — || January 1, 2005 || Catalina || CSS || ERI || align=right | 4.0 km || 
|-id=603 bgcolor=#E9E9E9
| 198603 ||  || — || January 6, 2005 || Socorro || LINEAR || — || align=right | 2.3 km || 
|-id=604 bgcolor=#d6d6d6
| 198604 ||  || — || January 8, 2005 || Socorro || LINEAR || — || align=right | 3.9 km || 
|-id=605 bgcolor=#d6d6d6
| 198605 ||  || — || January 11, 2005 || Socorro || LINEAR || KORslow || align=right | 2.2 km || 
|-id=606 bgcolor=#fefefe
| 198606 ||  || — || January 7, 2005 || Socorro || LINEAR || — || align=right | 1.3 km || 
|-id=607 bgcolor=#d6d6d6
| 198607 ||  || — || January 7, 2005 || Socorro || LINEAR || — || align=right | 6.6 km || 
|-id=608 bgcolor=#E9E9E9
| 198608 ||  || — || January 7, 2005 || Socorro || LINEAR || — || align=right | 1.8 km || 
|-id=609 bgcolor=#E9E9E9
| 198609 ||  || — || January 7, 2005 || Socorro || LINEAR || — || align=right | 3.0 km || 
|-id=610 bgcolor=#d6d6d6
| 198610 ||  || — || January 7, 2005 || Socorro || LINEAR || — || align=right | 4.4 km || 
|-id=611 bgcolor=#d6d6d6
| 198611 ||  || — || January 7, 2005 || Catalina || CSS || — || align=right | 3.8 km || 
|-id=612 bgcolor=#E9E9E9
| 198612 ||  || — || January 7, 2005 || Catalina || CSS || — || align=right | 1.8 km || 
|-id=613 bgcolor=#E9E9E9
| 198613 ||  || — || January 7, 2005 || Catalina || CSS || — || align=right | 4.0 km || 
|-id=614 bgcolor=#E9E9E9
| 198614 ||  || — || January 13, 2005 || Uccle || T. Pauwels || — || align=right | 4.0 km || 
|-id=615 bgcolor=#d6d6d6
| 198615 ||  || — || January 13, 2005 || Kitt Peak || Spacewatch || — || align=right | 5.6 km || 
|-id=616 bgcolor=#E9E9E9
| 198616 Lucabracali ||  ||  || January 14, 2005 || San Marcello || L. Tesi, G. Fagioli || WIT || align=right | 1.9 km || 
|-id=617 bgcolor=#E9E9E9
| 198617 ||  || — || January 11, 2005 || Socorro || LINEAR || — || align=right | 2.1 km || 
|-id=618 bgcolor=#E9E9E9
| 198618 ||  || — || January 12, 2005 || Socorro || LINEAR || — || align=right | 2.7 km || 
|-id=619 bgcolor=#E9E9E9
| 198619 ||  || — || January 12, 2005 || Socorro || LINEAR || — || align=right | 1.9 km || 
|-id=620 bgcolor=#E9E9E9
| 198620 ||  || — || January 13, 2005 || Socorro || LINEAR || PAD || align=right | 3.2 km || 
|-id=621 bgcolor=#fefefe
| 198621 ||  || — || January 15, 2005 || Socorro || LINEAR || NYS || align=right | 1.3 km || 
|-id=622 bgcolor=#E9E9E9
| 198622 ||  || — || January 15, 2005 || Socorro || LINEAR || — || align=right | 2.5 km || 
|-id=623 bgcolor=#E9E9E9
| 198623 ||  || — || January 15, 2005 || Catalina || CSS || — || align=right | 2.6 km || 
|-id=624 bgcolor=#E9E9E9
| 198624 ||  || — || January 15, 2005 || Catalina || CSS || — || align=right | 2.2 km || 
|-id=625 bgcolor=#d6d6d6
| 198625 ||  || — || January 15, 2005 || Catalina || CSS || — || align=right | 4.0 km || 
|-id=626 bgcolor=#E9E9E9
| 198626 ||  || — || January 11, 2005 || Socorro || LINEAR || — || align=right | 3.6 km || 
|-id=627 bgcolor=#E9E9E9
| 198627 ||  || — || January 12, 2005 || Socorro || LINEAR || — || align=right | 4.1 km || 
|-id=628 bgcolor=#d6d6d6
| 198628 ||  || — || January 13, 2005 || Kitt Peak || Spacewatch || — || align=right | 3.6 km || 
|-id=629 bgcolor=#E9E9E9
| 198629 ||  || — || January 13, 2005 || Socorro || LINEAR || MRX || align=right | 1.6 km || 
|-id=630 bgcolor=#d6d6d6
| 198630 ||  || — || January 13, 2005 || Kitt Peak || Spacewatch || — || align=right | 3.2 km || 
|-id=631 bgcolor=#d6d6d6
| 198631 ||  || — || January 13, 2005 || Kitt Peak || Spacewatch || — || align=right | 3.8 km || 
|-id=632 bgcolor=#d6d6d6
| 198632 ||  || — || January 13, 2005 || Kitt Peak || Spacewatch || — || align=right | 4.3 km || 
|-id=633 bgcolor=#d6d6d6
| 198633 ||  || — || January 13, 2005 || Kitt Peak || Spacewatch || — || align=right | 4.3 km || 
|-id=634 bgcolor=#d6d6d6
| 198634 Burgaymarta ||  ||  || January 15, 2005 || Vallemare di Borbona || Vallemare di Borbona Obs. || EOS || align=right | 2.6 km || 
|-id=635 bgcolor=#E9E9E9
| 198635 ||  || — || January 15, 2005 || Catalina || CSS || — || align=right | 3.5 km || 
|-id=636 bgcolor=#d6d6d6
| 198636 ||  || — || January 15, 2005 || Anderson Mesa || LONEOS || — || align=right | 5.9 km || 
|-id=637 bgcolor=#E9E9E9
| 198637 ||  || — || January 15, 2005 || Catalina || CSS || — || align=right | 4.0 km || 
|-id=638 bgcolor=#d6d6d6
| 198638 ||  || — || January 15, 2005 || Kitt Peak || Spacewatch || — || align=right | 3.9 km || 
|-id=639 bgcolor=#d6d6d6
| 198639 ||  || — || January 15, 2005 || Kitt Peak || Spacewatch || EOS || align=right | 3.1 km || 
|-id=640 bgcolor=#d6d6d6
| 198640 ||  || — || January 15, 2005 || Kitt Peak || Spacewatch || — || align=right | 4.2 km || 
|-id=641 bgcolor=#d6d6d6
| 198641 ||  || — || January 13, 2005 || Kitt Peak || Spacewatch || — || align=right | 2.6 km || 
|-id=642 bgcolor=#d6d6d6
| 198642 ||  || — || January 13, 2005 || Kitt Peak || Spacewatch || — || align=right | 4.3 km || 
|-id=643 bgcolor=#d6d6d6
| 198643 ||  || — || January 15, 2005 || Socorro || LINEAR || KOR || align=right | 2.1 km || 
|-id=644 bgcolor=#d6d6d6
| 198644 ||  || — || January 15, 2005 || Anderson Mesa || LONEOS || — || align=right | 4.6 km || 
|-id=645 bgcolor=#d6d6d6
| 198645 ||  || — || January 15, 2005 || Kitt Peak || Spacewatch || HYG || align=right | 3.9 km || 
|-id=646 bgcolor=#d6d6d6
| 198646 ||  || — || January 15, 2005 || Kitt Peak || Spacewatch || — || align=right | 4.8 km || 
|-id=647 bgcolor=#d6d6d6
| 198647 ||  || — || January 15, 2005 || Kitt Peak || Spacewatch || NAE || align=right | 4.9 km || 
|-id=648 bgcolor=#d6d6d6
| 198648 ||  || — || January 15, 2005 || Kitt Peak || Spacewatch || — || align=right | 3.1 km || 
|-id=649 bgcolor=#d6d6d6
| 198649 ||  || — || January 16, 2005 || Kitt Peak || Spacewatch || — || align=right | 4.7 km || 
|-id=650 bgcolor=#E9E9E9
| 198650 ||  || — || January 16, 2005 || Socorro || LINEAR || HEN || align=right | 1.6 km || 
|-id=651 bgcolor=#d6d6d6
| 198651 ||  || — || January 16, 2005 || Socorro || LINEAR || — || align=right | 5.1 km || 
|-id=652 bgcolor=#d6d6d6
| 198652 ||  || — || January 16, 2005 || Socorro || LINEAR || — || align=right | 5.3 km || 
|-id=653 bgcolor=#d6d6d6
| 198653 ||  || — || January 16, 2005 || Socorro || LINEAR || — || align=right | 3.4 km || 
|-id=654 bgcolor=#d6d6d6
| 198654 ||  || — || January 16, 2005 || Socorro || LINEAR || EOS || align=right | 3.6 km || 
|-id=655 bgcolor=#E9E9E9
| 198655 ||  || — || January 16, 2005 || Socorro || LINEAR || — || align=right | 3.9 km || 
|-id=656 bgcolor=#d6d6d6
| 198656 ||  || — || January 17, 2005 || Socorro || LINEAR || KAR || align=right | 1.9 km || 
|-id=657 bgcolor=#E9E9E9
| 198657 ||  || — || January 16, 2005 || Socorro || LINEAR || HOF || align=right | 4.5 km || 
|-id=658 bgcolor=#d6d6d6
| 198658 ||  || — || January 16, 2005 || Socorro || LINEAR || CHA || align=right | 3.5 km || 
|-id=659 bgcolor=#d6d6d6
| 198659 ||  || — || January 16, 2005 || Socorro || LINEAR || — || align=right | 4.5 km || 
|-id=660 bgcolor=#d6d6d6
| 198660 ||  || — || January 16, 2005 || Kitt Peak || Spacewatch || — || align=right | 3.8 km || 
|-id=661 bgcolor=#E9E9E9
| 198661 ||  || — || January 16, 2005 || Socorro || LINEAR || NEM || align=right | 3.9 km || 
|-id=662 bgcolor=#d6d6d6
| 198662 ||  || — || January 16, 2005 || Socorro || LINEAR || URS || align=right | 6.0 km || 
|-id=663 bgcolor=#d6d6d6
| 198663 ||  || — || January 16, 2005 || Kitt Peak || Spacewatch || — || align=right | 3.7 km || 
|-id=664 bgcolor=#d6d6d6
| 198664 ||  || — || January 16, 2005 || Kitt Peak || Spacewatch || KOR || align=right | 1.8 km || 
|-id=665 bgcolor=#d6d6d6
| 198665 ||  || — || January 16, 2005 || Kitt Peak || Spacewatch || — || align=right | 3.8 km || 
|-id=666 bgcolor=#d6d6d6
| 198666 ||  || — || January 16, 2005 || Kitt Peak || Spacewatch || — || align=right | 5.0 km || 
|-id=667 bgcolor=#E9E9E9
| 198667 ||  || — || January 17, 2005 || Catalina || CSS || — || align=right | 4.5 km || 
|-id=668 bgcolor=#E9E9E9
| 198668 ||  || — || January 18, 2005 || Catalina || CSS || — || align=right | 3.1 km || 
|-id=669 bgcolor=#E9E9E9
| 198669 ||  || — || January 18, 2005 || Catalina || CSS || — || align=right | 5.0 km || 
|-id=670 bgcolor=#d6d6d6
| 198670 ||  || — || January 31, 2005 || RAS || A. Lowe || LAU || align=right | 1.1 km || 
|-id=671 bgcolor=#d6d6d6
| 198671 ||  || — || January 31, 2005 || RAS || A. Lowe || — || align=right | 3.8 km || 
|-id=672 bgcolor=#d6d6d6
| 198672 ||  || — || January 16, 2005 || Mauna Kea || C. Veillet || THM || align=right | 3.5 km || 
|-id=673 bgcolor=#d6d6d6
| 198673 Herrero ||  ||  || January 19, 2005 || Catalina || CSS || ALA || align=right | 6.6 km || 
|-id=674 bgcolor=#d6d6d6
| 198674 ||  || — || February 1, 2005 || Catalina || CSS || EOS || align=right | 3.4 km || 
|-id=675 bgcolor=#E9E9E9
| 198675 ||  || — || February 1, 2005 || Catalina || CSS || AEO || align=right | 1.7 km || 
|-id=676 bgcolor=#d6d6d6
| 198676 ||  || — || February 1, 2005 || Catalina || CSS || — || align=right | 3.2 km || 
|-id=677 bgcolor=#d6d6d6
| 198677 ||  || — || February 1, 2005 || Kitt Peak || Spacewatch || LIX || align=right | 7.6 km || 
|-id=678 bgcolor=#d6d6d6
| 198678 ||  || — || February 1, 2005 || Kitt Peak || Spacewatch || CHA || align=right | 3.3 km || 
|-id=679 bgcolor=#d6d6d6
| 198679 ||  || — || February 1, 2005 || Kitt Peak || Spacewatch || VER || align=right | 4.7 km || 
|-id=680 bgcolor=#d6d6d6
| 198680 ||  || — || February 1, 2005 || Kitt Peak || Spacewatch || — || align=right | 4.0 km || 
|-id=681 bgcolor=#E9E9E9
| 198681 ||  || — || February 1, 2005 || Catalina || CSS || MRX || align=right | 1.7 km || 
|-id=682 bgcolor=#E9E9E9
| 198682 ||  || — || February 1, 2005 || Catalina || CSS || — || align=right | 1.5 km || 
|-id=683 bgcolor=#d6d6d6
| 198683 ||  || — || February 1, 2005 || Kitt Peak || Spacewatch || — || align=right | 3.4 km || 
|-id=684 bgcolor=#E9E9E9
| 198684 ||  || — || February 1, 2005 || Catalina || CSS || — || align=right | 3.9 km || 
|-id=685 bgcolor=#E9E9E9
| 198685 ||  || — || February 1, 2005 || Palomar || NEAT || HNA || align=right | 3.7 km || 
|-id=686 bgcolor=#E9E9E9
| 198686 ||  || — || February 2, 2005 || Kitt Peak || Spacewatch || HOF || align=right | 3.3 km || 
|-id=687 bgcolor=#E9E9E9
| 198687 ||  || — || February 2, 2005 || Socorro || LINEAR || — || align=right | 1.4 km || 
|-id=688 bgcolor=#d6d6d6
| 198688 ||  || — || February 2, 2005 || Catalina || CSS || — || align=right | 2.9 km || 
|-id=689 bgcolor=#E9E9E9
| 198689 ||  || — || February 2, 2005 || Catalina || CSS || — || align=right | 2.8 km || 
|-id=690 bgcolor=#d6d6d6
| 198690 ||  || — || February 2, 2005 || Kitt Peak || Spacewatch || — || align=right | 4.7 km || 
|-id=691 bgcolor=#d6d6d6
| 198691 ||  || — || February 2, 2005 || Catalina || CSS || — || align=right | 3.7 km || 
|-id=692 bgcolor=#d6d6d6
| 198692 ||  || — || February 2, 2005 || Catalina || CSS || — || align=right | 4.6 km || 
|-id=693 bgcolor=#d6d6d6
| 198693 ||  || — || February 3, 2005 || Socorro || LINEAR || — || align=right | 3.7 km || 
|-id=694 bgcolor=#d6d6d6
| 198694 ||  || — || February 1, 2005 || Catalina || CSS || — || align=right | 7.2 km || 
|-id=695 bgcolor=#d6d6d6
| 198695 ||  || — || February 1, 2005 || Catalina || CSS || 615 || align=right | 2.5 km || 
|-id=696 bgcolor=#d6d6d6
| 198696 ||  || — || February 2, 2005 || Socorro || LINEAR || — || align=right | 5.5 km || 
|-id=697 bgcolor=#d6d6d6
| 198697 ||  || — || February 4, 2005 || Catalina || CSS || — || align=right | 2.8 km || 
|-id=698 bgcolor=#d6d6d6
| 198698 ||  || — || February 4, 2005 || Palomar || NEAT || BRA || align=right | 2.1 km || 
|-id=699 bgcolor=#E9E9E9
| 198699 ||  || — || February 4, 2005 || Palomar || NEAT || — || align=right | 3.8 km || 
|-id=700 bgcolor=#d6d6d6
| 198700 Nataliegrünewald ||  ||  || February 5, 2005 || Wildberg || R. Apitzsch || — || align=right | 3.5 km || 
|}

198701–198800 

|-bgcolor=#E9E9E9
| 198701 ||  || — || February 1, 2005 || Catalina || CSS || — || align=right | 4.3 km || 
|-id=702 bgcolor=#E9E9E9
| 198702 ||  || — || February 1, 2005 || Catalina || CSS || — || align=right | 1.5 km || 
|-id=703 bgcolor=#d6d6d6
| 198703 ||  || — || February 1, 2005 || Catalina || CSS || THM || align=right | 3.6 km || 
|-id=704 bgcolor=#d6d6d6
| 198704 ||  || — || February 3, 2005 || Socorro || LINEAR || HYG || align=right | 3.6 km || 
|-id=705 bgcolor=#E9E9E9
| 198705 ||  || — || February 2, 2005 || Catalina || CSS || AEO || align=right | 1.9 km || 
|-id=706 bgcolor=#d6d6d6
| 198706 ||  || — || February 2, 2005 || Kitt Peak || Spacewatch || — || align=right | 3.9 km || 
|-id=707 bgcolor=#d6d6d6
| 198707 ||  || — || February 2, 2005 || Socorro || LINEAR || HYG || align=right | 4.4 km || 
|-id=708 bgcolor=#d6d6d6
| 198708 ||  || — || February 2, 2005 || Socorro || LINEAR || — || align=right | 4.2 km || 
|-id=709 bgcolor=#d6d6d6
| 198709 ||  || — || February 2, 2005 || Socorro || LINEAR || — || align=right | 2.4 km || 
|-id=710 bgcolor=#d6d6d6
| 198710 ||  || — || February 2, 2005 || Catalina || CSS || — || align=right | 4.8 km || 
|-id=711 bgcolor=#d6d6d6
| 198711 ||  || — || February 2, 2005 || Socorro || LINEAR || — || align=right | 4.6 km || 
|-id=712 bgcolor=#d6d6d6
| 198712 ||  || — || February 2, 2005 || Catalina || CSS || — || align=right | 6.6 km || 
|-id=713 bgcolor=#d6d6d6
| 198713 ||  || — || February 4, 2005 || Kitt Peak || Spacewatch || — || align=right | 5.6 km || 
|-id=714 bgcolor=#d6d6d6
| 198714 ||  || — || February 2, 2005 || Kitt Peak || Spacewatch || — || align=right | 3.5 km || 
|-id=715 bgcolor=#d6d6d6
| 198715 ||  || — || February 2, 2005 || Catalina || CSS || HYG || align=right | 3.9 km || 
|-id=716 bgcolor=#E9E9E9
| 198716 ||  || — || February 2, 2005 || Kitt Peak || Spacewatch || — || align=right | 4.8 km || 
|-id=717 bgcolor=#d6d6d6
| 198717 Szymczyk ||  ||  || February 13, 2005 || RAS || A. Lowe || — || align=right | 4.7 km || 
|-id=718 bgcolor=#E9E9E9
| 198718 ||  || — || February 9, 2005 || Anderson Mesa || LONEOS || — || align=right | 5.1 km || 
|-id=719 bgcolor=#d6d6d6
| 198719 ||  || — || February 9, 2005 || Anderson Mesa || LONEOS || EOS || align=right | 2.9 km || 
|-id=720 bgcolor=#d6d6d6
| 198720 ||  || — || February 1, 2005 || Kitt Peak || Spacewatch || — || align=right | 3.6 km || 
|-id=721 bgcolor=#d6d6d6
| 198721 ||  || — || February 2, 2005 || Kitt Peak || Spacewatch || HYG || align=right | 4.7 km || 
|-id=722 bgcolor=#d6d6d6
| 198722 ||  || — || February 9, 2005 || Mount Lemmon || Mount Lemmon Survey || SHU3:2 || align=right | 9.5 km || 
|-id=723 bgcolor=#d6d6d6
| 198723 ||  || — || March 1, 2005 || Kitt Peak || Spacewatch || — || align=right | 5.6 km || 
|-id=724 bgcolor=#d6d6d6
| 198724 ||  || — || March 1, 2005 || Kitt Peak || Spacewatch || — || align=right | 3.5 km || 
|-id=725 bgcolor=#d6d6d6
| 198725 ||  || — || March 2, 2005 || Catalina || CSS || — || align=right | 5.5 km || 
|-id=726 bgcolor=#d6d6d6
| 198726 ||  || — || March 3, 2005 || Kitt Peak || Spacewatch || — || align=right | 4.3 km || 
|-id=727 bgcolor=#d6d6d6
| 198727 ||  || — || March 3, 2005 || Catalina || CSS || EOS || align=right | 3.4 km || 
|-id=728 bgcolor=#d6d6d6
| 198728 ||  || — || March 3, 2005 || Catalina || CSS || — || align=right | 6.0 km || 
|-id=729 bgcolor=#d6d6d6
| 198729 ||  || — || March 3, 2005 || Catalina || CSS || — || align=right | 3.9 km || 
|-id=730 bgcolor=#d6d6d6
| 198730 ||  || — || March 3, 2005 || Catalina || CSS || THM || align=right | 3.5 km || 
|-id=731 bgcolor=#d6d6d6
| 198731 ||  || — || March 3, 2005 || Catalina || CSS || HYG || align=right | 4.9 km || 
|-id=732 bgcolor=#d6d6d6
| 198732 ||  || — || March 3, 2005 || Catalina || CSS || — || align=right | 4.8 km || 
|-id=733 bgcolor=#d6d6d6
| 198733 ||  || — || March 3, 2005 || Catalina || CSS || THM || align=right | 3.8 km || 
|-id=734 bgcolor=#d6d6d6
| 198734 ||  || — || March 3, 2005 || Catalina || CSS || HYG || align=right | 5.0 km || 
|-id=735 bgcolor=#d6d6d6
| 198735 ||  || — || March 3, 2005 || Catalina || CSS || — || align=right | 3.6 km || 
|-id=736 bgcolor=#d6d6d6
| 198736 ||  || — || March 3, 2005 || Socorro || LINEAR || THM || align=right | 4.6 km || 
|-id=737 bgcolor=#E9E9E9
| 198737 ||  || — || March 3, 2005 || Catalina || CSS || — || align=right | 2.4 km || 
|-id=738 bgcolor=#E9E9E9
| 198738 ||  || — || March 3, 2005 || Catalina || CSS || — || align=right | 4.2 km || 
|-id=739 bgcolor=#d6d6d6
| 198739 ||  || — || March 3, 2005 || Catalina || CSS || HYG || align=right | 5.6 km || 
|-id=740 bgcolor=#d6d6d6
| 198740 ||  || — || March 3, 2005 || Catalina || CSS || — || align=right | 4.3 km || 
|-id=741 bgcolor=#d6d6d6
| 198741 ||  || — || March 3, 2005 || Kitt Peak || Spacewatch || MEL || align=right | 5.6 km || 
|-id=742 bgcolor=#d6d6d6
| 198742 ||  || — || March 4, 2005 || Catalina || CSS || — || align=right | 3.5 km || 
|-id=743 bgcolor=#d6d6d6
| 198743 ||  || — || March 4, 2005 || Socorro || LINEAR || — || align=right | 5.5 km || 
|-id=744 bgcolor=#E9E9E9
| 198744 ||  || — || March 2, 2005 || Kitt Peak || Spacewatch || — || align=right | 2.7 km || 
|-id=745 bgcolor=#d6d6d6
| 198745 ||  || — || March 3, 2005 || Catalina || CSS || VER || align=right | 6.0 km || 
|-id=746 bgcolor=#d6d6d6
| 198746 ||  || — || March 3, 2005 || Catalina || CSS || THM || align=right | 5.4 km || 
|-id=747 bgcolor=#E9E9E9
| 198747 ||  || — || March 3, 2005 || Catalina || CSS || — || align=right | 1.4 km || 
|-id=748 bgcolor=#d6d6d6
| 198748 ||  || — || March 4, 2005 || Kitt Peak || Spacewatch || — || align=right | 3.7 km || 
|-id=749 bgcolor=#d6d6d6
| 198749 ||  || — || March 4, 2005 || Kitt Peak || Spacewatch || — || align=right | 5.6 km || 
|-id=750 bgcolor=#d6d6d6
| 198750 ||  || — || March 4, 2005 || Kitt Peak || Spacewatch || — || align=right | 5.1 km || 
|-id=751 bgcolor=#d6d6d6
| 198751 ||  || — || March 4, 2005 || Kitt Peak || Spacewatch || HYG || align=right | 3.6 km || 
|-id=752 bgcolor=#FFC2E0
| 198752 ||  || — || March 4, 2005 || Mount Lemmon || Mount Lemmon Survey || AMO || align=right data-sort-value="0.39" | 390 m || 
|-id=753 bgcolor=#d6d6d6
| 198753 ||  || — || March 3, 2005 || Kitt Peak || Spacewatch || — || align=right | 3.2 km || 
|-id=754 bgcolor=#d6d6d6
| 198754 ||  || — || March 3, 2005 || Catalina || CSS || — || align=right | 3.5 km || 
|-id=755 bgcolor=#d6d6d6
| 198755 ||  || — || March 3, 2005 || Kitt Peak || Spacewatch || — || align=right | 6.1 km || 
|-id=756 bgcolor=#d6d6d6
| 198756 ||  || — || March 4, 2005 || Mount Lemmon || Mount Lemmon Survey || — || align=right | 3.7 km || 
|-id=757 bgcolor=#d6d6d6
| 198757 ||  || — || March 4, 2005 || Socorro || LINEAR || THM || align=right | 3.3 km || 
|-id=758 bgcolor=#E9E9E9
| 198758 ||  || — || March 4, 2005 || Socorro || LINEAR || — || align=right | 2.6 km || 
|-id=759 bgcolor=#d6d6d6
| 198759 ||  || — || March 4, 2005 || Mount Lemmon || Mount Lemmon Survey || — || align=right | 3.3 km || 
|-id=760 bgcolor=#d6d6d6
| 198760 ||  || — || March 8, 2005 || Socorro || LINEAR || EOS || align=right | 3.2 km || 
|-id=761 bgcolor=#d6d6d6
| 198761 ||  || — || March 8, 2005 || Socorro || LINEAR || HYG || align=right | 4.1 km || 
|-id=762 bgcolor=#d6d6d6
| 198762 ||  || — || March 8, 2005 || Socorro || LINEAR || — || align=right | 4.3 km || 
|-id=763 bgcolor=#d6d6d6
| 198763 ||  || — || March 8, 2005 || Anderson Mesa || LONEOS || EUP || align=right | 6.2 km || 
|-id=764 bgcolor=#d6d6d6
| 198764 ||  || — || March 8, 2005 || Socorro || LINEAR || — || align=right | 6.2 km || 
|-id=765 bgcolor=#d6d6d6
| 198765 ||  || — || March 10, 2005 || RAS || A. Lowe || — || align=right | 5.4 km || 
|-id=766 bgcolor=#d6d6d6
| 198766 ||  || — || March 3, 2005 || Catalina || CSS || — || align=right | 5.1 km || 
|-id=767 bgcolor=#E9E9E9
| 198767 ||  || — || March 3, 2005 || Catalina || CSS || DOR || align=right | 4.2 km || 
|-id=768 bgcolor=#d6d6d6
| 198768 ||  || — || March 3, 2005 || Catalina || CSS || — || align=right | 4.7 km || 
|-id=769 bgcolor=#d6d6d6
| 198769 ||  || — || March 3, 2005 || Catalina || CSS || — || align=right | 3.0 km || 
|-id=770 bgcolor=#d6d6d6
| 198770 ||  || — || March 3, 2005 || Catalina || CSS || — || align=right | 5.3 km || 
|-id=771 bgcolor=#d6d6d6
| 198771 ||  || — || March 3, 2005 || Catalina || CSS || — || align=right | 4.1 km || 
|-id=772 bgcolor=#d6d6d6
| 198772 ||  || — || March 3, 2005 || Catalina || CSS || TEL || align=right | 2.0 km || 
|-id=773 bgcolor=#E9E9E9
| 198773 ||  || — || March 3, 2005 || Catalina || CSS || — || align=right | 1.7 km || 
|-id=774 bgcolor=#d6d6d6
| 198774 ||  || — || March 3, 2005 || Catalina || CSS || — || align=right | 3.2 km || 
|-id=775 bgcolor=#d6d6d6
| 198775 ||  || — || March 3, 2005 || Catalina || CSS || VER || align=right | 4.9 km || 
|-id=776 bgcolor=#d6d6d6
| 198776 ||  || — || March 3, 2005 || Kitt Peak || Spacewatch || — || align=right | 4.3 km || 
|-id=777 bgcolor=#E9E9E9
| 198777 ||  || — || March 3, 2005 || Catalina || CSS || — || align=right | 2.6 km || 
|-id=778 bgcolor=#d6d6d6
| 198778 ||  || — || March 4, 2005 || Catalina || CSS || EOS || align=right | 3.0 km || 
|-id=779 bgcolor=#d6d6d6
| 198779 ||  || — || March 4, 2005 || Catalina || CSS || — || align=right | 5.8 km || 
|-id=780 bgcolor=#d6d6d6
| 198780 ||  || — || March 4, 2005 || Socorro || LINEAR || EOS || align=right | 3.3 km || 
|-id=781 bgcolor=#d6d6d6
| 198781 ||  || — || March 4, 2005 || Mount Lemmon || Mount Lemmon Survey || THM || align=right | 2.7 km || 
|-id=782 bgcolor=#d6d6d6
| 198782 ||  || — || March 4, 2005 || Socorro || LINEAR || — || align=right | 3.8 km || 
|-id=783 bgcolor=#d6d6d6
| 198783 ||  || — || March 7, 2005 || Socorro || LINEAR || EOS || align=right | 3.6 km || 
|-id=784 bgcolor=#d6d6d6
| 198784 ||  || — || March 8, 2005 || Socorro || LINEAR || — || align=right | 6.0 km || 
|-id=785 bgcolor=#d6d6d6
| 198785 ||  || — || March 8, 2005 || Anderson Mesa || LONEOS || THM || align=right | 4.0 km || 
|-id=786 bgcolor=#d6d6d6
| 198786 ||  || — || March 9, 2005 || Mount Lemmon || Mount Lemmon Survey || — || align=right | 5.0 km || 
|-id=787 bgcolor=#d6d6d6
| 198787 ||  || — || March 9, 2005 || Mount Lemmon || Mount Lemmon Survey || — || align=right | 3.1 km || 
|-id=788 bgcolor=#d6d6d6
| 198788 ||  || — || March 9, 2005 || Mount Lemmon || Mount Lemmon Survey || CRO || align=right | 6.0 km || 
|-id=789 bgcolor=#E9E9E9
| 198789 ||  || — || March 9, 2005 || Kitt Peak || Spacewatch || — || align=right | 3.3 km || 
|-id=790 bgcolor=#E9E9E9
| 198790 ||  || — || March 9, 2005 || Catalina || CSS || — || align=right | 3.8 km || 
|-id=791 bgcolor=#d6d6d6
| 198791 ||  || — || March 9, 2005 || Kitt Peak || Spacewatch || VER || align=right | 5.7 km || 
|-id=792 bgcolor=#d6d6d6
| 198792 ||  || — || March 9, 2005 || Mount Lemmon || Mount Lemmon Survey || — || align=right | 5.8 km || 
|-id=793 bgcolor=#d6d6d6
| 198793 ||  || — || March 9, 2005 || Mount Lemmon || Mount Lemmon Survey || THM || align=right | 3.1 km || 
|-id=794 bgcolor=#d6d6d6
| 198794 ||  || — || March 9, 2005 || Mount Lemmon || Mount Lemmon Survey || THM || align=right | 3.4 km || 
|-id=795 bgcolor=#d6d6d6
| 198795 ||  || — || March 10, 2005 || Mount Lemmon || Mount Lemmon Survey || THM || align=right | 3.2 km || 
|-id=796 bgcolor=#d6d6d6
| 198796 ||  || — || March 10, 2005 || Kitt Peak || Spacewatch || HYG || align=right | 3.6 km || 
|-id=797 bgcolor=#E9E9E9
| 198797 ||  || — || March 9, 2005 || Catalina || CSS || RAF || align=right | 1.8 km || 
|-id=798 bgcolor=#d6d6d6
| 198798 ||  || — || March 9, 2005 || Catalina || CSS || — || align=right | 3.6 km || 
|-id=799 bgcolor=#d6d6d6
| 198799 ||  || — || March 9, 2005 || Mount Lemmon || Mount Lemmon Survey || — || align=right | 3.5 km || 
|-id=800 bgcolor=#d6d6d6
| 198800 ||  || — || March 11, 2005 || Mount Lemmon || Mount Lemmon Survey || — || align=right | 3.5 km || 
|}

198801–198900 

|-bgcolor=#d6d6d6
| 198801 ||  || — || March 7, 2005 || Siding Spring || SSS || HYG || align=right | 5.0 km || 
|-id=802 bgcolor=#d6d6d6
| 198802 ||  || — || March 8, 2005 || Socorro || LINEAR || EOS || align=right | 2.9 km || 
|-id=803 bgcolor=#d6d6d6
| 198803 ||  || — || March 9, 2005 || Kitt Peak || Spacewatch || — || align=right | 4.7 km || 
|-id=804 bgcolor=#d6d6d6
| 198804 ||  || — || March 9, 2005 || Mount Lemmon || Mount Lemmon Survey || KOR || align=right | 1.7 km || 
|-id=805 bgcolor=#E9E9E9
| 198805 ||  || — || March 11, 2005 || Mount Lemmon || Mount Lemmon Survey || NEM || align=right | 3.3 km || 
|-id=806 bgcolor=#d6d6d6
| 198806 ||  || — || March 11, 2005 || Mount Lemmon || Mount Lemmon Survey || — || align=right | 4.4 km || 
|-id=807 bgcolor=#d6d6d6
| 198807 ||  || — || March 11, 2005 || Mount Lemmon || Mount Lemmon Survey || 637 || align=right | 3.8 km || 
|-id=808 bgcolor=#d6d6d6
| 198808 ||  || — || March 11, 2005 || Anderson Mesa || LONEOS || — || align=right | 5.3 km || 
|-id=809 bgcolor=#E9E9E9
| 198809 ||  || — || March 8, 2005 || Catalina || CSS || MIT || align=right | 3.7 km || 
|-id=810 bgcolor=#d6d6d6
| 198810 ||  || — || March 8, 2005 || Catalina || CSS || BRA || align=right | 2.5 km || 
|-id=811 bgcolor=#d6d6d6
| 198811 ||  || — || March 10, 2005 || Mount Lemmon || Mount Lemmon Survey || THM || align=right | 3.6 km || 
|-id=812 bgcolor=#d6d6d6
| 198812 ||  || — || March 4, 2005 || Kitt Peak || Spacewatch || — || align=right | 2.8 km || 
|-id=813 bgcolor=#E9E9E9
| 198813 ||  || — || March 9, 2005 || Catalina || CSS || — || align=right | 3.7 km || 
|-id=814 bgcolor=#d6d6d6
| 198814 ||  || — || March 10, 2005 || Anderson Mesa || LONEOS || EOS || align=right | 3.6 km || 
|-id=815 bgcolor=#d6d6d6
| 198815 ||  || — || March 12, 2005 || Great Shefford || Great Shefford Obs. || 7:4 || align=right | 7.5 km || 
|-id=816 bgcolor=#d6d6d6
| 198816 ||  || — || March 10, 2005 || Catalina || CSS || HYG || align=right | 4.8 km || 
|-id=817 bgcolor=#d6d6d6
| 198817 ||  || — || March 11, 2005 || Socorro || LINEAR || — || align=right | 4.7 km || 
|-id=818 bgcolor=#d6d6d6
| 198818 ||  || — || March 12, 2005 || Socorro || LINEAR || VER || align=right | 4.4 km || 
|-id=819 bgcolor=#d6d6d6
| 198819 ||  || — || March 12, 2005 || Socorro || LINEAR || EOS || align=right | 2.7 km || 
|-id=820 bgcolor=#d6d6d6
| 198820 Iwanowska ||  ||  || March 13, 2005 || Moletai || K. Černis, J. Zdanavičius || — || align=right | 5.4 km || 
|-id=821 bgcolor=#d6d6d6
| 198821 ||  || — || March 11, 2005 || Mount Lemmon || Mount Lemmon Survey || — || align=right | 5.0 km || 
|-id=822 bgcolor=#d6d6d6
| 198822 ||  || — || March 13, 2005 || Mount Lemmon || Mount Lemmon Survey || — || align=right | 4.9 km || 
|-id=823 bgcolor=#d6d6d6
| 198823 ||  || — || March 13, 2005 || Kitt Peak || Spacewatch || HYG || align=right | 3.4 km || 
|-id=824 bgcolor=#d6d6d6
| 198824 ||  || — || March 13, 2005 || Catalina || CSS || HYG || align=right | 5.4 km || 
|-id=825 bgcolor=#d6d6d6
| 198825 ||  || — || March 3, 2005 || Kitt Peak || Spacewatch || — || align=right | 3.8 km || 
|-id=826 bgcolor=#d6d6d6
| 198826 ||  || — || March 3, 2005 || Kitt Peak || Spacewatch || — || align=right | 4.9 km || 
|-id=827 bgcolor=#d6d6d6
| 198827 ||  || — || March 3, 2005 || Catalina || CSS || EOS || align=right | 3.2 km || 
|-id=828 bgcolor=#d6d6d6
| 198828 ||  || — || March 8, 2005 || Mount Lemmon || Mount Lemmon Survey || THM || align=right | 3.8 km || 
|-id=829 bgcolor=#d6d6d6
| 198829 ||  || — || March 10, 2005 || Catalina || CSS || — || align=right | 5.9 km || 
|-id=830 bgcolor=#d6d6d6
| 198830 ||  || — || March 1, 2005 || Catalina || CSS || — || align=right | 6.1 km || 
|-id=831 bgcolor=#E9E9E9
| 198831 ||  || — || March 9, 2005 || Siding Spring || SSS || — || align=right | 2.2 km || 
|-id=832 bgcolor=#d6d6d6
| 198832 ||  || — || March 9, 2005 || Kitt Peak || M. W. Buie || — || align=right | 3.5 km || 
|-id=833 bgcolor=#d6d6d6
| 198833 ||  || — || March 11, 2005 || Kitt Peak || M. W. Buie || — || align=right | 4.2 km || 
|-id=834 bgcolor=#d6d6d6
| 198834 ||  || — || March 8, 2005 || Mount Lemmon || Mount Lemmon Survey || EOS || align=right | 3.1 km || 
|-id=835 bgcolor=#d6d6d6
| 198835 ||  || — || April 1, 2005 || Anderson Mesa || LONEOS || LIX || align=right | 5.6 km || 
|-id=836 bgcolor=#d6d6d6
| 198836 ||  || — || April 4, 2005 || Catalina || CSS || — || align=right | 5.9 km || 
|-id=837 bgcolor=#d6d6d6
| 198837 ||  || — || April 5, 2005 || Palomar || NEAT || — || align=right | 8.9 km || 
|-id=838 bgcolor=#d6d6d6
| 198838 ||  || — || April 4, 2005 || Socorro || LINEAR || — || align=right | 6.8 km || 
|-id=839 bgcolor=#fefefe
| 198839 ||  || — || April 5, 2005 || Mount Lemmon || Mount Lemmon Survey || NYS || align=right | 1.4 km || 
|-id=840 bgcolor=#d6d6d6
| 198840 ||  || — || April 6, 2005 || Mount Lemmon || Mount Lemmon Survey || HYG || align=right | 3.0 km || 
|-id=841 bgcolor=#d6d6d6
| 198841 ||  || — || April 5, 2005 || Anderson Mesa || LONEOS || MEL || align=right | 2.7 km || 
|-id=842 bgcolor=#d6d6d6
| 198842 ||  || — || April 4, 2005 || Mount Lemmon || Mount Lemmon Survey || — || align=right | 3.7 km || 
|-id=843 bgcolor=#d6d6d6
| 198843 ||  || — || April 10, 2005 || Mount Lemmon || Mount Lemmon Survey || — || align=right | 3.5 km || 
|-id=844 bgcolor=#E9E9E9
| 198844 ||  || — || April 9, 2005 || Siding Spring || SSS || — || align=right | 2.6 km || 
|-id=845 bgcolor=#d6d6d6
| 198845 ||  || — || April 2, 2005 || Anderson Mesa || LONEOS || — || align=right | 5.7 km || 
|-id=846 bgcolor=#d6d6d6
| 198846 ||  || — || April 15, 2005 || Siding Spring || SSS || EUP || align=right | 8.4 km || 
|-id=847 bgcolor=#d6d6d6
| 198847 ||  || — || April 12, 2005 || Kitt Peak || M. W. Buie || THM || align=right | 3.1 km || 
|-id=848 bgcolor=#d6d6d6
| 198848 ||  || — || April 10, 2005 || Kitt Peak || M. W. Buie || — || align=right | 4.2 km || 
|-id=849 bgcolor=#d6d6d6
| 198849 ||  || — || April 30, 2005 || Kitt Peak || Spacewatch || — || align=right | 3.1 km || 
|-id=850 bgcolor=#d6d6d6
| 198850 ||  || — || May 10, 2005 || Kitt Peak || Spacewatch || — || align=right | 5.5 km || 
|-id=851 bgcolor=#d6d6d6
| 198851 ||  || — || May 8, 2005 || Siding Spring || SSS || — || align=right | 3.2 km || 
|-id=852 bgcolor=#d6d6d6
| 198852 ||  || — || May 10, 2005 || Kitt Peak || Spacewatch || — || align=right | 5.3 km || 
|-id=853 bgcolor=#d6d6d6
| 198853 ||  || — || May 4, 2005 || Mount Lemmon || Mount Lemmon Survey || THM || align=right | 2.8 km || 
|-id=854 bgcolor=#d6d6d6
| 198854 ||  || — || May 14, 2005 || Palomar || NEAT || — || align=right | 5.6 km || 
|-id=855 bgcolor=#fefefe
| 198855 ||  || — || June 2, 2005 || Socorro || LINEAR || H || align=right data-sort-value="0.72" | 720 m || 
|-id=856 bgcolor=#FFC2E0
| 198856 ||  || — || June 4, 2005 || Socorro || LINEAR || AMO +1km || align=right data-sort-value="0.74" | 740 m || 
|-id=857 bgcolor=#d6d6d6
| 198857 ||  || — || June 1, 2005 || Kitt Peak || Spacewatch || ALA || align=right | 5.2 km || 
|-id=858 bgcolor=#C2FFFF
| 198858 ||  || — || June 14, 2005 || Kitt Peak || Spacewatch || L4 || align=right | 14 km || 
|-id=859 bgcolor=#fefefe
| 198859 ||  || — || June 28, 2005 || Palomar || NEAT || H || align=right data-sort-value="0.87" | 870 m || 
|-id=860 bgcolor=#fefefe
| 198860 ||  || — || July 4, 2005 || Palomar || NEAT || H || align=right | 1.0 km || 
|-id=861 bgcolor=#fefefe
| 198861 ||  || — || July 30, 2005 || Socorro || LINEAR || H || align=right data-sort-value="0.93" | 930 m || 
|-id=862 bgcolor=#fefefe
| 198862 ||  || — || August 25, 2005 || Palomar || NEAT || H || align=right data-sort-value="0.85" | 850 m || 
|-id=863 bgcolor=#fefefe
| 198863 ||  || — || August 27, 2005 || Anderson Mesa || LONEOS || — || align=right data-sort-value="0.83" | 830 m || 
|-id=864 bgcolor=#E9E9E9
| 198864 ||  || — || August 30, 2005 || Kitt Peak || Spacewatch || — || align=right | 1.4 km || 
|-id=865 bgcolor=#fefefe
| 198865 ||  || — || August 30, 2005 || RAS || R. Hutsebaut || — || align=right data-sort-value="0.97" | 970 m || 
|-id=866 bgcolor=#fefefe
| 198866 ||  || — || August 28, 2005 || Anderson Mesa || LONEOS || H || align=right data-sort-value="0.86" | 860 m || 
|-id=867 bgcolor=#fefefe
| 198867 ||  || — || August 30, 2005 || Palomar || NEAT || — || align=right | 1.1 km || 
|-id=868 bgcolor=#fefefe
| 198868 ||  || — || September 2, 2005 || Palomar || NEAT || H || align=right | 1.3 km || 
|-id=869 bgcolor=#fefefe
| 198869 ||  || — || September 11, 2005 || Anderson Mesa || LONEOS || FLO || align=right | 1.0 km || 
|-id=870 bgcolor=#fefefe
| 198870 ||  || — || September 10, 2005 || Anderson Mesa || LONEOS || — || align=right | 1.4 km || 
|-id=871 bgcolor=#fefefe
| 198871 ||  || — || September 8, 2005 || Socorro || LINEAR || — || align=right | 1.3 km || 
|-id=872 bgcolor=#fefefe
| 198872 ||  || — || September 23, 2005 || Catalina || CSS || — || align=right data-sort-value="0.73" | 730 m || 
|-id=873 bgcolor=#fefefe
| 198873 ||  || — || September 23, 2005 || Kitt Peak || Spacewatch || — || align=right | 1.3 km || 
|-id=874 bgcolor=#fefefe
| 198874 ||  || — || September 23, 2005 || Catalina || CSS || — || align=right data-sort-value="0.83" | 830 m || 
|-id=875 bgcolor=#fefefe
| 198875 ||  || — || September 24, 2005 || Kitt Peak || Spacewatch || FLO || align=right data-sort-value="0.82" | 820 m || 
|-id=876 bgcolor=#fefefe
| 198876 ||  || — || September 24, 2005 || Kitt Peak || Spacewatch || — || align=right | 1.2 km || 
|-id=877 bgcolor=#fefefe
| 198877 ||  || — || September 30, 2005 || Siding Spring || SSS || H || align=right | 1.3 km || 
|-id=878 bgcolor=#fefefe
| 198878 ||  || — || September 24, 2005 || Kitt Peak || Spacewatch || — || align=right data-sort-value="0.73" | 730 m || 
|-id=879 bgcolor=#fefefe
| 198879 ||  || — || September 29, 2005 || Anderson Mesa || LONEOS || — || align=right | 1.1 km || 
|-id=880 bgcolor=#fefefe
| 198880 ||  || — || September 25, 2005 || Kitt Peak || Spacewatch || — || align=right data-sort-value="0.76" | 760 m || 
|-id=881 bgcolor=#fefefe
| 198881 ||  || — || September 29, 2005 || Anderson Mesa || LONEOS || — || align=right | 1.0 km || 
|-id=882 bgcolor=#fefefe
| 198882 ||  || — || September 29, 2005 || Anderson Mesa || LONEOS || FLO || align=right data-sort-value="0.98" | 980 m || 
|-id=883 bgcolor=#fefefe
| 198883 ||  || — || September 30, 2005 || Catalina || CSS || NYS || align=right | 2.3 km || 
|-id=884 bgcolor=#fefefe
| 198884 ||  || — || September 30, 2005 || Kitt Peak || Spacewatch || — || align=right | 1.1 km || 
|-id=885 bgcolor=#fefefe
| 198885 ||  || — || September 30, 2005 || Mount Lemmon || Mount Lemmon Survey || V || align=right | 1.0 km || 
|-id=886 bgcolor=#fefefe
| 198886 ||  || — || October 2, 2005 || Catalina || CSS || — || align=right | 1.3 km || 
|-id=887 bgcolor=#fefefe
| 198887 ||  || — || October 4, 2005 || Mount Lemmon || Mount Lemmon Survey || — || align=right data-sort-value="0.93" | 930 m || 
|-id=888 bgcolor=#FA8072
| 198888 ||  || — || October 6, 2005 || Anderson Mesa || LONEOS || — || align=right | 1.2 km || 
|-id=889 bgcolor=#fefefe
| 198889 ||  || — || October 3, 2005 || Kitt Peak || Spacewatch || FLO || align=right data-sort-value="0.91" | 910 m || 
|-id=890 bgcolor=#fefefe
| 198890 ||  || — || October 3, 2005 || Socorro || LINEAR || — || align=right | 1.3 km || 
|-id=891 bgcolor=#fefefe
| 198891 ||  || — || October 5, 2005 || Kitt Peak || Spacewatch || — || align=right | 1.9 km || 
|-id=892 bgcolor=#fefefe
| 198892 ||  || — || October 8, 2005 || Socorro || LINEAR || V || align=right data-sort-value="0.84" | 840 m || 
|-id=893 bgcolor=#fefefe
| 198893 ||  || — || October 8, 2005 || Kitt Peak || Spacewatch || — || align=right data-sort-value="0.66" | 660 m || 
|-id=894 bgcolor=#fefefe
| 198894 ||  || — || October 11, 2005 || Kitt Peak || Spacewatch || — || align=right | 1.5 km || 
|-id=895 bgcolor=#fefefe
| 198895 ||  || — || October 9, 2005 || Kitt Peak || Spacewatch || NYS || align=right | 2.1 km || 
|-id=896 bgcolor=#fefefe
| 198896 ||  || — || October 13, 2005 || Socorro || LINEAR || FLO || align=right data-sort-value="0.85" | 850 m || 
|-id=897 bgcolor=#fefefe
| 198897 ||  || — || October 26, 2005 || Ottmarsheim || C. Rinner || FLO || align=right | 1.2 km || 
|-id=898 bgcolor=#fefefe
| 198898 ||  || — || October 22, 2005 || Kitt Peak || Spacewatch || — || align=right data-sort-value="0.76" | 760 m || 
|-id=899 bgcolor=#fefefe
| 198899 ||  || — || October 23, 2005 || Catalina || CSS || — || align=right data-sort-value="0.94" | 940 m || 
|-id=900 bgcolor=#fefefe
| 198900 ||  || — || October 23, 2005 || Catalina || CSS || — || align=right data-sort-value="0.96" | 960 m || 
|}

198901–199000 

|-bgcolor=#fefefe
| 198901 ||  || — || October 24, 2005 || Kitt Peak || Spacewatch || — || align=right data-sort-value="0.62" | 620 m || 
|-id=902 bgcolor=#fefefe
| 198902 ||  || — || October 24, 2005 || Kitt Peak || Spacewatch || FLO || align=right data-sort-value="0.94" | 940 m || 
|-id=903 bgcolor=#fefefe
| 198903 ||  || — || October 24, 2005 || Kitt Peak || Spacewatch || — || align=right | 1.0 km || 
|-id=904 bgcolor=#fefefe
| 198904 ||  || — || October 24, 2005 || Kitt Peak || Spacewatch || NYS || align=right data-sort-value="0.82" | 820 m || 
|-id=905 bgcolor=#fefefe
| 198905 ||  || — || October 24, 2005 || Kitt Peak || Spacewatch || — || align=right data-sort-value="0.94" | 940 m || 
|-id=906 bgcolor=#fefefe
| 198906 ||  || — || October 24, 2005 || Kitt Peak || Spacewatch || — || align=right | 1.1 km || 
|-id=907 bgcolor=#fefefe
| 198907 ||  || — || October 24, 2005 || Kitt Peak || Spacewatch || NYS || align=right | 2.0 km || 
|-id=908 bgcolor=#fefefe
| 198908 ||  || — || October 25, 2005 || Kitt Peak || Spacewatch || — || align=right | 1.1 km || 
|-id=909 bgcolor=#fefefe
| 198909 ||  || — || October 23, 2005 || Catalina || CSS || — || align=right data-sort-value="0.97" | 970 m || 
|-id=910 bgcolor=#fefefe
| 198910 ||  || — || October 25, 2005 || Anderson Mesa || LONEOS || — || align=right | 1.2 km || 
|-id=911 bgcolor=#fefefe
| 198911 ||  || — || October 25, 2005 || Catalina || CSS || — || align=right | 1.1 km || 
|-id=912 bgcolor=#fefefe
| 198912 ||  || — || October 23, 2005 || Palomar || NEAT || FLO || align=right data-sort-value="0.98" | 980 m || 
|-id=913 bgcolor=#fefefe
| 198913 ||  || — || October 22, 2005 || Kitt Peak || Spacewatch || — || align=right data-sort-value="0.85" | 850 m || 
|-id=914 bgcolor=#fefefe
| 198914 ||  || — || October 22, 2005 || Kitt Peak || Spacewatch || — || align=right | 1.2 km || 
|-id=915 bgcolor=#fefefe
| 198915 ||  || — || October 24, 2005 || Kitt Peak || Spacewatch || — || align=right data-sort-value="0.83" | 830 m || 
|-id=916 bgcolor=#fefefe
| 198916 ||  || — || October 24, 2005 || Kitt Peak || Spacewatch || — || align=right | 1.2 km || 
|-id=917 bgcolor=#fefefe
| 198917 ||  || — || October 24, 2005 || Kitt Peak || Spacewatch || — || align=right | 1.1 km || 
|-id=918 bgcolor=#fefefe
| 198918 ||  || — || October 24, 2005 || Palomar || NEAT || — || align=right | 1.0 km || 
|-id=919 bgcolor=#fefefe
| 198919 ||  || — || October 25, 2005 || Mount Lemmon || Mount Lemmon Survey || — || align=right data-sort-value="0.94" | 940 m || 
|-id=920 bgcolor=#fefefe
| 198920 ||  || — || October 30, 2005 || Vicques || M. Ory || — || align=right data-sort-value="0.94" | 940 m || 
|-id=921 bgcolor=#fefefe
| 198921 ||  || — || October 22, 2005 || Catalina || CSS || — || align=right | 1.1 km || 
|-id=922 bgcolor=#fefefe
| 198922 ||  || — || October 24, 2005 || Kitt Peak || Spacewatch || — || align=right | 1.0 km || 
|-id=923 bgcolor=#fefefe
| 198923 ||  || — || October 24, 2005 || Kitt Peak || Spacewatch || NYS || align=right | 2.4 km || 
|-id=924 bgcolor=#fefefe
| 198924 ||  || — || October 24, 2005 || Kitt Peak || Spacewatch || — || align=right data-sort-value="0.82" | 820 m || 
|-id=925 bgcolor=#fefefe
| 198925 ||  || — || October 25, 2005 || Mount Lemmon || Mount Lemmon Survey || — || align=right data-sort-value="0.82" | 820 m || 
|-id=926 bgcolor=#fefefe
| 198926 ||  || — || October 25, 2005 || Mount Lemmon || Mount Lemmon Survey || — || align=right data-sort-value="0.98" | 980 m || 
|-id=927 bgcolor=#fefefe
| 198927 ||  || — || October 25, 2005 || Mount Lemmon || Mount Lemmon Survey || — || align=right | 1.3 km || 
|-id=928 bgcolor=#fefefe
| 198928 ||  || — || October 25, 2005 || Mount Lemmon || Mount Lemmon Survey || — || align=right | 2.1 km || 
|-id=929 bgcolor=#fefefe
| 198929 ||  || — || October 27, 2005 || Mount Lemmon || Mount Lemmon Survey || — || align=right | 1.3 km || 
|-id=930 bgcolor=#fefefe
| 198930 ||  || — || October 25, 2005 || Kitt Peak || Spacewatch || — || align=right | 1.0 km || 
|-id=931 bgcolor=#fefefe
| 198931 ||  || — || October 25, 2005 || Kitt Peak || Spacewatch || FLO || align=right data-sort-value="0.65" | 650 m || 
|-id=932 bgcolor=#fefefe
| 198932 ||  || — || October 25, 2005 || Kitt Peak || Spacewatch || FLO || align=right data-sort-value="0.82" | 820 m || 
|-id=933 bgcolor=#fefefe
| 198933 ||  || — || October 22, 2005 || Kitt Peak || Spacewatch || — || align=right | 1.2 km || 
|-id=934 bgcolor=#fefefe
| 198934 ||  || — || October 24, 2005 || Kitt Peak || Spacewatch || FLO || align=right data-sort-value="0.74" | 740 m || 
|-id=935 bgcolor=#fefefe
| 198935 ||  || — || October 27, 2005 || Palomar || NEAT || V || align=right data-sort-value="0.93" | 930 m || 
|-id=936 bgcolor=#fefefe
| 198936 ||  || — || October 25, 2005 || Kitt Peak || Spacewatch || — || align=right | 1.9 km || 
|-id=937 bgcolor=#fefefe
| 198937 ||  || — || October 27, 2005 || Kitt Peak || Spacewatch || — || align=right data-sort-value="0.83" | 830 m || 
|-id=938 bgcolor=#E9E9E9
| 198938 ||  || — || October 28, 2005 || Mount Lemmon || Mount Lemmon Survey || — || align=right | 1.8 km || 
|-id=939 bgcolor=#fefefe
| 198939 ||  || — || October 24, 2005 || Kitt Peak || Spacewatch || — || align=right | 1.1 km || 
|-id=940 bgcolor=#fefefe
| 198940 ||  || — || October 24, 2005 || Kitt Peak || Spacewatch || FLO || align=right data-sort-value="0.83" | 830 m || 
|-id=941 bgcolor=#fefefe
| 198941 ||  || — || October 25, 2005 || Mount Lemmon || Mount Lemmon Survey || — || align=right | 1.0 km || 
|-id=942 bgcolor=#fefefe
| 198942 ||  || — || October 26, 2005 || Kitt Peak || Spacewatch || V || align=right | 1.2 km || 
|-id=943 bgcolor=#fefefe
| 198943 ||  || — || October 26, 2005 || Kitt Peak || Spacewatch || — || align=right | 1.2 km || 
|-id=944 bgcolor=#fefefe
| 198944 ||  || — || October 26, 2005 || Kitt Peak || Spacewatch || FLO || align=right data-sort-value="0.99" | 990 m || 
|-id=945 bgcolor=#fefefe
| 198945 ||  || — || October 26, 2005 || Kitt Peak || Spacewatch || FLO || align=right data-sort-value="0.87" | 870 m || 
|-id=946 bgcolor=#fefefe
| 198946 ||  || — || October 26, 2005 || Kitt Peak || Spacewatch || NYS || align=right data-sort-value="0.92" | 920 m || 
|-id=947 bgcolor=#fefefe
| 198947 ||  || — || October 26, 2005 || Kitt Peak || Spacewatch || — || align=right | 1.2 km || 
|-id=948 bgcolor=#fefefe
| 198948 ||  || — || October 27, 2005 || Mount Lemmon || Mount Lemmon Survey || — || align=right data-sort-value="0.67" | 670 m || 
|-id=949 bgcolor=#fefefe
| 198949 ||  || — || October 27, 2005 || Kitt Peak || Spacewatch || — || align=right | 1.2 km || 
|-id=950 bgcolor=#fefefe
| 198950 ||  || — || October 29, 2005 || Catalina || CSS || — || align=right | 1.2 km || 
|-id=951 bgcolor=#fefefe
| 198951 ||  || — || October 28, 2005 || Kitt Peak || Spacewatch || MAS || align=right data-sort-value="0.88" | 880 m || 
|-id=952 bgcolor=#fefefe
| 198952 ||  || — || October 30, 2005 || Kitt Peak || Spacewatch || — || align=right | 1.1 km || 
|-id=953 bgcolor=#fefefe
| 198953 ||  || — || October 23, 2005 || Catalina || CSS || V || align=right data-sort-value="0.93" | 930 m || 
|-id=954 bgcolor=#fefefe
| 198954 ||  || — || October 27, 2005 || Catalina || CSS || FLO || align=right | 1.0 km || 
|-id=955 bgcolor=#fefefe
| 198955 ||  || — || October 29, 2005 || Catalina || CSS || — || align=right data-sort-value="0.96" | 960 m || 
|-id=956 bgcolor=#fefefe
| 198956 ||  || — || October 29, 2005 || Catalina || CSS || — || align=right | 1.4 km || 
|-id=957 bgcolor=#fefefe
| 198957 ||  || — || October 29, 2005 || Kitt Peak || Spacewatch || — || align=right data-sort-value="0.78" | 780 m || 
|-id=958 bgcolor=#fefefe
| 198958 ||  || — || October 29, 2005 || Mount Lemmon || Mount Lemmon Survey || — || align=right data-sort-value="0.98" | 980 m || 
|-id=959 bgcolor=#d6d6d6
| 198959 ||  || — || October 27, 2005 || Socorro || LINEAR || — || align=right | 4.5 km || 
|-id=960 bgcolor=#fefefe
| 198960 ||  || — || October 28, 2005 || Kitt Peak || Spacewatch || — || align=right | 1.0 km || 
|-id=961 bgcolor=#fefefe
| 198961 ||  || — || October 28, 2005 || Kitt Peak || Spacewatch || FLO || align=right data-sort-value="0.76" | 760 m || 
|-id=962 bgcolor=#fefefe
| 198962 ||  || — || October 29, 2005 || Mount Lemmon || Mount Lemmon Survey || — || align=right data-sort-value="0.94" | 940 m || 
|-id=963 bgcolor=#fefefe
| 198963 ||  || — || October 27, 2005 || Mount Lemmon || Mount Lemmon Survey || FLO || align=right data-sort-value="0.94" | 940 m || 
|-id=964 bgcolor=#fefefe
| 198964 ||  || — || October 28, 2005 || Mount Lemmon || Mount Lemmon Survey || — || align=right | 1.1 km || 
|-id=965 bgcolor=#fefefe
| 198965 ||  || — || October 29, 2005 || Socorro || LINEAR || — || align=right | 2.3 km || 
|-id=966 bgcolor=#fefefe
| 198966 ||  || — || October 30, 2005 || Mount Lemmon || Mount Lemmon Survey || NYS || align=right data-sort-value="0.94" | 940 m || 
|-id=967 bgcolor=#fefefe
| 198967 ||  || — || October 31, 2005 || Mount Lemmon || Mount Lemmon Survey || — || align=right | 1.2 km || 
|-id=968 bgcolor=#E9E9E9
| 198968 ||  || — || October 24, 2005 || Mauna Kea || D. J. Tholen || — || align=right | 3.8 km || 
|-id=969 bgcolor=#E9E9E9
| 198969 ||  || — || October 25, 2005 || Kitt Peak || Spacewatch || — || align=right | 1.4 km || 
|-id=970 bgcolor=#fefefe
| 198970 ||  || — || October 28, 2005 || Mount Lemmon || Mount Lemmon Survey || NYS || align=right data-sort-value="0.89" | 890 m || 
|-id=971 bgcolor=#d6d6d6
| 198971 ||  || — || October 31, 2005 || Mauna Kea || D. J. Tholen || THM || align=right | 2.8 km || 
|-id=972 bgcolor=#fefefe
| 198972 ||  || — || October 27, 2005 || Mount Lemmon || Mount Lemmon Survey || — || align=right | 1.9 km || 
|-id=973 bgcolor=#fefefe
| 198973 ||  || — || November 6, 2005 || Ottmarsheim || C. Rinner || — || align=right data-sort-value="0.74" | 740 m || 
|-id=974 bgcolor=#fefefe
| 198974 ||  || — || November 6, 2005 || Ottmarsheim || C. Rinner || — || align=right | 1.1 km || 
|-id=975 bgcolor=#fefefe
| 198975 ||  || — || November 1, 2005 || Kitt Peak || Spacewatch || — || align=right data-sort-value="0.90" | 900 m || 
|-id=976 bgcolor=#fefefe
| 198976 ||  || — || November 2, 2005 || Socorro || LINEAR || — || align=right | 1.1 km || 
|-id=977 bgcolor=#fefefe
| 198977 ||  || — || November 2, 2005 || Socorro || LINEAR || PHO || align=right | 2.6 km || 
|-id=978 bgcolor=#fefefe
| 198978 ||  || — || November 4, 2005 || Kitt Peak || Spacewatch || — || align=right | 1.1 km || 
|-id=979 bgcolor=#fefefe
| 198979 ||  || — || November 4, 2005 || Kitt Peak || Spacewatch || — || align=right data-sort-value="0.71" | 710 m || 
|-id=980 bgcolor=#fefefe
| 198980 ||  || — || November 4, 2005 || Kitt Peak || Spacewatch || — || align=right | 1.0 km || 
|-id=981 bgcolor=#fefefe
| 198981 ||  || — || November 3, 2005 || Mount Lemmon || Mount Lemmon Survey || NYS || align=right | 2.1 km || 
|-id=982 bgcolor=#fefefe
| 198982 ||  || — || November 3, 2005 || Mount Lemmon || Mount Lemmon Survey || — || align=right data-sort-value="0.89" | 890 m || 
|-id=983 bgcolor=#fefefe
| 198983 ||  || — || November 1, 2005 || Mount Lemmon || Mount Lemmon Survey || — || align=right data-sort-value="0.89" | 890 m || 
|-id=984 bgcolor=#fefefe
| 198984 ||  || — || November 1, 2005 || Mount Lemmon || Mount Lemmon Survey || NYS || align=right | 1.0 km || 
|-id=985 bgcolor=#fefefe
| 198985 ||  || — || November 1, 2005 || Mount Lemmon || Mount Lemmon Survey || — || align=right data-sort-value="0.89" | 890 m || 
|-id=986 bgcolor=#fefefe
| 198986 ||  || — || November 6, 2005 || Mount Lemmon || Mount Lemmon Survey || — || align=right | 1.1 km || 
|-id=987 bgcolor=#E9E9E9
| 198987 ||  || — || November 5, 2005 || Kitt Peak || Spacewatch || — || align=right | 3.7 km || 
|-id=988 bgcolor=#fefefe
| 198988 ||  || — || November 1, 2005 || Anderson Mesa || LONEOS || — || align=right | 1.3 km || 
|-id=989 bgcolor=#fefefe
| 198989 Valeriethomas ||  ||  || November 2, 2005 || Mount Lemmon || Mount Lemmon Survey || NYS || align=right | 2.2 km || 
|-id=990 bgcolor=#fefefe
| 198990 ||  || — || November 6, 2005 || Mount Lemmon || Mount Lemmon Survey || — || align=right data-sort-value="0.80" | 800 m || 
|-id=991 bgcolor=#fefefe
| 198991 ||  || — || November 11, 2005 || Kitt Peak || Spacewatch || — || align=right | 1.2 km || 
|-id=992 bgcolor=#E9E9E9
| 198992 ||  || — || November 7, 2005 || Mauna Kea || Mauna Kea Obs. || — || align=right | 1.4 km || 
|-id=993 bgcolor=#fefefe
| 198993 Epoigny ||  ||  || November 20, 2005 || Nogales || J.-C. Merlin || FLO || align=right data-sort-value="0.65" | 650 m || 
|-id=994 bgcolor=#fefefe
| 198994 ||  || — || November 22, 2005 || Kitt Peak || Spacewatch || — || align=right data-sort-value="0.74" | 740 m || 
|-id=995 bgcolor=#fefefe
| 198995 ||  || — || November 21, 2005 || Kitt Peak || Spacewatch || — || align=right data-sort-value="0.85" | 850 m || 
|-id=996 bgcolor=#fefefe
| 198996 ||  || — || November 22, 2005 || Kitt Peak || Spacewatch || — || align=right | 1.8 km || 
|-id=997 bgcolor=#fefefe
| 198997 ||  || — || November 22, 2005 || Kitt Peak || Spacewatch || — || align=right data-sort-value="0.72" | 720 m || 
|-id=998 bgcolor=#fefefe
| 198998 ||  || — || November 21, 2005 || Kitt Peak || Spacewatch || — || align=right data-sort-value="0.74" | 740 m || 
|-id=999 bgcolor=#fefefe
| 198999 ||  || — || November 22, 2005 || Kitt Peak || Spacewatch || — || align=right | 1.4 km || 
|-id=000 bgcolor=#fefefe
| 199000 ||  || — || November 22, 2005 || Kitt Peak || Spacewatch || FLO || align=right | 1.0 km || 
|}

References

External links 
 Discovery Circumstances: Numbered Minor Planets (195001)–(200000) (IAU Minor Planet Center)

0198